Bulbophyllum Thouars 1822, is a large orchid genus that contains over 2000 epiphytic species from the orchid family Orchidaceae. The following is a list of Bulbophyllum species accepted by the World Checklist of Selected Plant Families as at January 2019:

Species

A
Bulbophyllum abbreviatum Schltr. 1924
Bulbophyllum abbrevilabium Carr 1932
Bulbophyllum aberrans Schltr. 1911
Bulbophyllum ablepharon Schltr. 1923
Bulbophyllum absconditum J.J.Sm. 1905
Bulbophyllum absconditum subsp. absconditum
Bulbophyllum absconditum subsp. hastula J.J.Verm. 1993
Bulbophyllum acanthoglossum Schltr. 1913
Bulbophyllum acropogon Schltr. 1913
Bulbophyllum acuminatum (Ridl.) Ridl. 1907: Tapering-flower Bulbophyllum
Bulbophyllum acutibracteatum De Wild. 1921
Bulbophyllum acutibracteatum var. acutibracteatum
Bulbophyllum acutibracteatum var. rubrobrunneopapillosum (De Wild.) J.J.Verm. 1986
Bulbophyllum acutiflorum A.Rich. 1841
Bulbophyllum acutilingue J.J.Sm. 1908
Bulbophyllum acutilobum J.J.Verm. & P.O'Byrne 2008
Bulbophyllum acutispicatum H.Perrier 1951
Bulbophyllum adangense Seidenf. 1979
Bulbophyllum adelphidium J.J.Verm. 1993
Bulbophyllum adenoblepharon Schltr. 1913
Bulbophyllum adiamantinum Brade 1951
Bulbophyllum adjungens Seidenf. 1979
Bulbophyllum adolphii Schltr. 1921
Bulbophyllum aechmophorum J.J.Verm. 1993
Bulbophyllum aemulum Schltr. 1905
Bulbophyllum aeolium Ames (1913 publ. 1914)
Bulbophyllum aeolium subsp. aeolium
Bulbophyllum aeolium subsp. padasense
Bulbophyllum aestivale Ames 1915
Bulbophyllum affine Wall. ex Lindl. 1830: Similar Bulbophyllum
Bulbophyllum afzelii Schltr. 1918
Bulbophyllum afzelii var. afzelii
Bulbophyllum afzelii var. microdoron (Schltr.) Bosser 1965
Bulbophyllum agapethoides Schltr. 1911
Bulbophyllum agastor Garay, Hamer & Siegerist 1996: Flat Bulbophyllum
Bulbophyllum aggregatum Besser 1965: Crowded Bulbophyllum
Bulbophyllum aithorhachis J.J.Verm. 1996
Bulbophyllum alabastraceus P.Royen 1979
Bulbophyllum alagense Ames 1907: Alag River Bulbophyllum
Bulbophyllum alatum J.J.Verm. 1991
Bulbophyllum albibracteum Seidenf. 1979
Bulbophyllum albidostylidium Seidenf. 1995
Bulbophyllum albociliatum (Tang S.Liu & H.Y.Su) K.Nakaj. 1973
Bulbophyllum albociliatum var. albociliatumBulbophyllum albociliatum var. shanlinshiense T.P.Lin & Y.N.Chang (2013)Bulbophyllum albociliatum var. weiminianum T.P.Lin & Y.N.Chang (2005)Bulbophyllum alboroseum Ames 1922Bulbophyllum alcicorne C.S.P.Parish & Rchb.f. 1874Bulbophyllum alexandrae Schltr. 1925: Alexander's BulbophyllumBulbophyllum algidum Ridl. 1916Bulbophyllum alinae Szlach.(2001)Bulbophyllum alkmaarense J.J.Sm. 1911Bulbophyllum alleizettei Schltr. 1922Bulbophyllum allenkerrii Seidenf. 1979: Allen Kerr's BulbophyllumBulbophyllum alliifolium J.J.Sm. 1905Bulbophyllum allotrion J.J.Verm. & P.O'Byrne (2008)Bulbophyllum alpinum (P.Royen) J.J.Verm., Schuit. & de Vogel (2014)Bulbophyllum alsiosum Ames 1912Bulbophyllum alticaule Ridl. 1916Bulbophyllum alticola Schltr. 1912Bulbophyllum alveatum J.J.Verm. 1993Bulbophyllum amauroloma J.J.Verm. & P.O'Byrne (2008)Bulbophyllum amazonicum L.O.Williams 1939Bulbophyllum ambatoavense Bosser 2004Bulbophyllum amblyacron Schltr. 1913Bulbophyllum amblyanthum Schltr. 1913Bulbophyllum ambrense H.Perrier 1937Bulbophyllum ambrosia (Hance) Schltr. 1919: Sweet-smelling BulbophyllumBulbophyllum ambrosia subsp. ambrosiaBulbophyllum ambrosia subsp. nepalensis J.J.Wood 1986Bulbophyllum amoenum Bosser 1965Bulbophyllum amorosoanum Naive, M.Leon & Cootes (2017)Bulbophyllum amphorimorphum H.Perrier 1951Bulbophyllum amplebracteatum Teijsm. & Binn. 1862Bulbophyllum amplebracteatum subsp. amplebracteatumBulbophyllum amplebracteatum subsp. carunculatum (Garay, Hamer & Siegerist) J.J.Verm. & P.O'Byrne (2011).Bulbophyllum amplebracteatum subsp. orthoglossum (H.Wendl. & Kraenzl.) J.J.Verm. & P.O'Byrne (2011).Bulbophyllum amplifolium (Rolfe) N.P.Balakr. & Sud.Chowdhury 1968Bulbophyllum amplistigmaticum Kores 1989Bulbophyllum anaclastum J.J.Verm. 1993Bulbophyllum anakbaruppui J.J.Verm. & P.O'Byrne 2003Bulbophyllum analamazoatrae Schltr. 1924Bulbophyllum anascaputum Cootes, Cabactulan (2017)Bulbophyllum anceps Rolfe 1892Bulbophyllum andersonii (Hook.f.) J.J.Sm. 1912Bulbophyllum andohahelense H.Perrier 1939Bulbophyllum andreeae A.D.Hawkes 1956Bulbophyllum anguliferum Ames & C.Schweinf. in O.Ames 1920: Angle-carrying BulbophyllumBulbophyllum angusteovatum Seidenf. 1979Bulbophyllum angustifolium (Blume) Lindl. 1830Bulbophyllum angustipetalum (Seidenf.) J.J.Verm., Schuit. & de Vogel (2014)Bulbophyllum anisopterum J.J.Verm. & P.O'Byrne 2003Bulbophyllum anjae J.J.Verm. & de Vogel (2014)Bulbophyllum anjozorobeense Bosser 2000Bulbophyllum ankaizinense (Jum. & Perrier) Schltr. 1924: Ankaizine BulbophyllumBulbophyllum ankaratranum Schltr. 1924Bulbophyllum ankerae J.J.Verm. & P.O'Byrne (2011)Bulbophyllum ankylochele J.J.Verm. 1993Bulbophyllum ankylodon J.J.Verm. & P.O'Byrne (2008)Bulbophyllum ankylorhinon J.J.Verm. 1992Bulbophyllum annamense (Garay) Sieder & Kiehn (2009)Bulbophyllum annandalei Ridl. 1920Bulbophyllum anodon J.J.Verm., Thavipoke & J.Phelps (2014)Bulbophyllum antennatum Schltr. in K.M.Schumann & C.A.G.Lauterbach 1905Bulbophyllum antenniferum (Lindl.) Rchb.f. in W.G.Walpers 1861Bulbophyllum antheae (J.J.Verm. & A.L.Lamb) J.J.Verm., Schuit. & de Vogel (2014)Bulbophyllum antioquiense Kraenzl. 1899Bulbophyllum antongilense Schltr. 1924Bulbophyllum apertum Schltr. 1906Bulbophyllum apetalum Lindl. (1862)Bulbophyllum aphanopetalum Schltr. 1906Bulbophyllum apheles J.J.Verm. 1991Bulbophyllum apiculatum Schltr. 1913Bulbophyllum apiferum Carr 1930Bulbophyllum apodum Hook.f. 1890: Bulbless BulbophyllumBulbophyllum apoense Schuit. & de Vogel 2003Bulbophyllum appendiculatum (Rolfe) J.J.Sm. 1912Bulbophyllum appressicaule Ridl. 1917Bulbophyllum appressum Schltr. 1913Bulbophyllum approximatum Ridl. 1886Bulbophyllum aquinoi (Cootes, M.Leon & Naive) J.M.H.Shaw (2017)Bulbophyllum arachnites Ridl. (1909)Bulbophyllum araiophyllum J.J.Verm., Schuit. & de Vogel (2014)Bulbophyllum arcaniflorum Ridl. 1916Bulbophyllum arcuatilabium Aver. 1999Bulbophyllum ardjunense J.J.Sm. 1927Bulbophyllum arfakense J.J.Sm. in L.S.Gibbs 1917Bulbophyllum arfakianum Kraenzl. 1904Bulbophyllum argoxanthum J.J.Verm. (2008)Bulbophyllum argyropus (Endl.) Rchb.f. 1876 – silver strand orchidBulbophyllum arianeae Fraga & E.C.Smidt 2004Bulbophyllum aristatum (Rchb.f.) Hemsl. 1884Bulbophyllum aristilabre J.J.Sm. 1912Bulbophyllum aristopetalum Kores 1989Bulbophyllum armeniacum J.J.Sm. 1917Bulbophyllum arminii Sieder & Kiehn (2009)Bulbophyllum arrectum Kraenzl. 1921Bulbophyllum arsoanum J.J.Sm. 1912Bulbophyllum artostigma J.J.Verm. 1993Bulbophyllum artvogelii J.J.Verm., P.O'Byrne & A.L.Lamb (2015)Bulbophyllum arunachalense (A.N.Rao) J.J.Verm., Schuit. & de Vogel (2014)Bulbophyllum aschemon J.J.Verm. & A.L.Lamb (2008)Bulbophyllum ascochiloides J.J.Sm. 1927Bulbophyllum ascochilum J.J.Verm. (2008)Bulbophyllum asperilingue Schltr. 1919Bulbophyllum aspersum J.J.Sm. 1912Bulbophyllum astelidum Aver. 1994Bulbophyllum atratum J.J.Sm. 1917Bulbophyllum atrolabium Schltr. 1923Bulbophyllum atropurpureum Barb.Rodr. 1877: Black-purple BulbophyllumBulbophyllum atrorubens Schltr. 1906Bulbophyllum atrosanguineum Aver. 2003Bulbophyllum atroviride J.J.Verm. (2008)Bulbophyllum attenuatum Rolfe 1896: Dagger-shaped BulbophyllumBulbophyllum aubrevillei Bosser 1965Bulbophyllum aundense Ormerod (2005)Bulbophyllum auratum (Lindl.) Rchb.f. in W.G.Walpers 1861Bulbophyllum aureoapex Schltr. 1913Bulbophyllum aureobrunneum Schltr. 1913Bulbophyllum aureum (Hook.f.) J.J.Sm. 1912: Golden BulbophyllumBulbophyllum auricomum Lindl. 1830Bulbophyllum auriculatum J.J.Verm. & P.O'Byrne 2003Bulbophyllum auriflorum H.Perrier 1937Bulbophyllum auritum J.J.Verm. & P.O'Byrne (2008)Bulbophyllum auroreum J.J.Sm. 1928Bulbophyllum australe (Seidenf.) J.J.Verm., Schuit. & de Vogel (2014)Bulbophyllum averyanovii Seidenf. 1992Bulbophyllum ayuthayense J.J.Verm., Schuit. & de Vogel (2014)

BBulbophyllum bacilliferum J.J.Sm. 1928Bulbophyllum baculiferum Ridl. 1916Bulbophyllum baileyi F.Muell. 1875 - fruit fly orchid[[Bulbophyllum bakoense J.J.Verm. & A.L.Lamb (2008)
Bulbophyllum baladeanum J.J.Sm. 1912
Bulbophyllum balgooiji J.J.Verm., Schuit. & de Vogel (2014)
Bulbophyllum ballii P.J.Cribb 1977
Bulbophyllum bandischii Garay 1992
Bulbophyllum bantaengense (J.J.Sm.) J.J.Verm. & P.O'Byrne (2011)
Bulbophyllum barbasapientis J.J.Verm. & P.O'Byrne (2008)
Bulbophyllum barbatum Barb.Rodr. 1882
Bulbophyllum barbavagabundum J.J.Verm. (2008)
Bulbophyllum barbigerum Lindl. 1837: Bearded Bulbophyllum
Bulbophyllum bariense Gagnep. 1930: Bari Bulbophyllum
Bulbophyllum baronii Ridl. 1885
Bulbophyllum basisetum J.J.Sm. 1929
Bulbophyllum bathieanum Schltr. 1916
Bulbophyllum bavonis J.J.Verm. 1984
Bulbophyllum beccarii Rchb.f. 1879: Beccar's Bulbophyllum
Bulbophyllum belonaeglossum J.J.Verm. & A.L.Lamb (2008)
Bulbophyllum belopetalum J.J.Verm., P.O'Byrne & A.L.Lamb (2015)
Bulbophyllum berenicis Rchb.f. 1880
Bulbophyllum bernadetteae J.-B.Castillon (2012)
Bulbophyllum betchei F.Muell. 1881
Bulbophyllum biantennatum Schltr. 1913
Bulbophyllum bicarinatum J.J.Verm. & A.L.Lamb (2013)
Bulbophyllum bicaudatum Schltr. 1913
Bulbophyllum bicolor Lindl. 1830
Bulbophyllum bicoloratum Schltr. 1924
Bulbophyllum bidentatum (Barb.Rodr.) Cogn. in C.F.P.von Martius & auct. suc. (eds.) 1902
Bulbophyllum bidenticulatum J.J.Verm. 1984
Bulbophyllum bidenticulatum subsp. bidenticulatum
Bulbophyllum bidenticulatum subsp. joyceae J.J.Verm. 1987
Bulbophyllum bidoupense Aver. & Duy (2015)
Bulbophyllum bifarium Lindl. 1864
Bulbophyllum biflorum Teijsm. & Binn. 1855: Two-flowered Bulbophyllum
Bulbophyllum bifurcatoflorens (Fukuy.) J.J.Verm., Schuit. & de Vogel (2014)
Bulbophyllum bigibbosum J.J.Sm. 1913
Bulbophyllum bigibbum Schltr. 1923
Bulbophyllum bilobipetalum J.J.Sm. (1927)
Bulbophyllum birmense Schltr. 1910
Bulbophyllum bisepalum Schltr. in K.M.Schumann & C.A.G.Lauterbach 1905
Bulbophyllum biseriale Carr 1930
Bulbophyllum biserratum J.J.Verm. (2008)
Bulbophyllum bisetoides Seidenf. 1970
Bulbophyllum bisetum Lindl. 1842
Bulbophyllum bismarckense Schltr. in K.M.Schumann & C.A.G.Lauterbach 1905
Bulbophyllum bittnerianum Schltr. 1910
Bulbophyllum blaoense Tich & Diep ex Aver. & Tich (2015)
Bulbophyllum blepharistes Rchb.f. 1872: Fringed Bulbophyllum
Bulbophyllum blepharocardium Schltr. (1913)
Bulbophyllum blepharochilum Garay 1999: Lip-fringe Bulbophyllum
Bulbophyllum blepharopetalum Schltr. 1913
Bulbophyllum bliteum J.J.Verm. 1993
Bulbophyllum bohnkeanum Campacci (2008)
Bulbophyllum boiteaui H.Perrier 1939
Bulbophyllum bolivianum Schltr. 1922
Bulbophyllum bolsteri Ames 1912
Bulbophyllum bombycinum J.J.Verm. (2008)
Bulbophyllum bomiense Z.H.Tsi 1978
Bulbophyllum bonaccordense (C.S.Kumar) J.J.Verm. (2014)
Bulbophyllum boninense (Schltr.) J.J.Sm. 1912
Bulbophyllum bontocense Ames 1912
Bulbophyllum boonjee B.Gray & D.L.Jones 1984 – maroon strand orchid
Bulbophyllum boosii J.J.Verm. & Kindler (2015)
Bulbophyllum bootanense C.S.P.Parish & Rchb.f. 1874
Bulbophyllum botryophorum Ridl. 1897
Bulbophyllum boudetianum Fraga 2004
Bulbophyllum boulbetii Tixier 1966
Bulbophyllum bowkettiae F.M.Bailey 1884 – striped snake orchid
Bulbophyllum brachiatum (Schltr.) J.J.Verm., Schuit. & de Vogel (2014)
Bulbophyllum brachychilum Schltr. 1913
Bulbophyllum brachypetalum Schltr. 1913
Bulbophyllum brachyphyton Schltr. 1918
Bulbophyllum brachypus (Schltr.) J.J.Verm., Schuit. & de Vogel (2014)
Bulbophyllum brachyrhopalon J.J.Verm., P.O'Byrne & A.L.Lamb (2015)
Bulbophyllum brachystachyum Schltr. 1924
Bulbophyllum brachytriche J.J.Verm. & P.O'Byrne (2008)
Bulbophyllum bracteatum F.M.Bailey 1891 – blotched pineapple orchid
Bulbophyllum bracteolatum Lindl. 1838
Bulbophyllum bractescens Rolfe ex Kerr 1927
Bulbophyllum brassii J.J.Verm. 1993
Bulbophyllum breimerianum J.J.Verm. & A.Vogel (2007)
Bulbophyllum breve Schltr. 1913
Bulbophyllum brevibrachiatum (Schltr.) J.J.Sm. 1912
Bulbophyllum brevicolumna J.J.Verm. 1991
Bulbophyllum brevilabium Schltr. 1913
Bulbophyllum brevipedunculatum T.C.Hsu & S.W.Chung (2008)
Bulbophyllum brevipes Ridl. 1898
Bulbophyllum brevipetalum H.Perrier 1937
Bulbophyllum brevispicatum Z.H.Tsi & S.C.Chen 1994
Bulbophyllum brienianum (Rolfe) Merr. 1921
Bulbophyllum bruneiense J.J.Verm. & A.L.Lamb (2008)
Bulbophyllum bryoides Guillaumin 1957
Bulbophyllum bryophilum Hermans (2007)
Bulbophyllum bryophytoides G.A.Fisch. & Andriant. (2009)
Bulbophyllum bulhartii Sieder & Kiehn (2009).
Bulbophyllum bulliferum J.J.Sm. 1908
Bulbophyllum burfordiense Garay, Hamer & Siegerist 1996: Burford Bulbophyllum
Bulbophyllum burttii Summerh. 1953

C
Bulbophyllum caecilii J.J.Sm. 1927
Bulbophyllum caecum J.J.Sm. 1926
Bulbophyllum caespitosum Thouars 1822
Bulbophyllum calceilabium J.J.Sm. 1929
Bulbophyllum calceolus J.J.Verm. 1991
Bulbophyllum caldericola G.F.Walsh 1993
Bulbophyllum calimanianum (2007)
Bulbophyllum callichroma Schltr. 1913: Green-Calli Bulbophyllum
Bulbophyllum calliferum J.J.Verm. & A.L.Lamb (2013)
Bulbophyllum callipes J.J.Sm. 1908
Bulbophyllum callosum Bosser 1965: Callous Bulbophyllum
Bulbophyllum caloglossum Schltr. 1913: Beautiful-lipped Bulbophyllum
Bulbophyllum calviventer J.J.Verm. 1993
Bulbophyllum calvum Summerh. 1966
Bulbophyllum calyptogyne J.J.Verm. & P.O'Byrne (2011).
Bulbophyllum calyptratum Kraenzl. 1895: Hooded Bulbophyllum
Bulbophyllum calyptratum var. calyptratum
Bulbophyllum calyptratum var. graminifolium (Summerh.) J.J.Verm. 1986
Bulbophyllum calyptratum var. lucifugum (Summerh.) J.J.Verm. 1987
Bulbophyllum calyptropus Schltr. 1924
Bulbophyllum cambodianum (Christenson) J.J.Verm., Schuit. & de Vogel (2014).
Bulbophyllum cameronense Garay, Hamer & Siegerist 1996: Cameron Highlands Bulbophyllum
Bulbophyllum campanuliflorum J.J.Verm., Schuit. & de Vogel (2014).
Bulbophyllum campos-portoi Brade 1951
Bulbophyllum camptochilum J.J.Verm. 1996
Bulbophyllum candidum Hook.f. 1890
Bulbophyllum canlaonense Ames 1912
Bulbophyllum cantagallense (Barb.Rodr.) Cogn. in C.F.P.von Martius & auct. suc. (eds.) 1902
Bulbophyllum capilligerum J.J.Sm. 1927
Bulbophyllum capillipes C.S.P.Parish & Rchb.f. 1874
Bulbophyllum capitatum (Blume) Lindl. 1830
Bulbophyllum capituliflorum Rolfe 1906
Bulbophyllum capnophyton J.J.Verm., Schuit. & de Vogel (2014)
Bulbophyllum capuronii Bosser 1971
Bulbophyllum caputgnomonis J.J.Verm. 1993
Bulbophyllum carassense R.C.Mota, F.Barros & Stehmann (2009)
Bulbophyllum cardiobulbum Bosser 1965
Bulbophyllum cardiophyllum J.J.Verm. 1991
Bulbophyllum careyanum (Hook.) Spreng. 1826: Carey's Bulbophyllum
Bulbophyllum cariniflorum Rchb.f. in W.G.Walpers 1861
Bulbophyllum carinilabium J.J.Verm. 1991
Bulbophyllum carnosilabium Summerh. (1953 publ. 1954).
Bulbophyllum carnosisepalum J.J.Verm. 1986
Bulbophyllum carrianum J.J.Verm. 2000
Bulbophyllum cataractarum Schltr. 1924
Bulbophyllum catenarium Ridl. 1894: Chain-like Bulbophyllum
Bulbophyllum catenulatum Kraenzl. 1921: Chain-shaped Bulbophyllum
Bulbophyllum cateorum J.J.Verm. 1992
Bulbophyllum catillus J.J.Verm. & P.O'Byrne 2003
Bulbophyllum caudatisepalum Ames & C.Schweinf. in O.Ames 1920
Bulbophyllum caudatum Lindl. (1830).
Bulbophyllum caudipetalum J.J.Sm. 1913
Bulbophyllum cauliflorum Hook.f. 1890
Bulbophyllum cauliflorum var. cauliflorum
Bulbophyllum cauliflorum var. sikkimense N.Pearce & P.J.Cribb 2001
Bulbophyllum cavibulbum J.J.Sm. 1929
Bulbophyllum cavipes J.J.Verm. 1996
Bulbophyllum centrosemiflorum J.J.Sm. 1912
Bulbophyllum cephalophorum Garay, Hamer & Siegerist 1996: Spherical-inflorescence Bulbophyllum
Bulbophyllum cerambyx J.J.Sm. 1915
Bulbophyllum ceratostylis J.J.Sm. 1904
Bulbophyllum cercanthum (Garay, Hamer & Siegerist) J.M.H.Shaw (2009).
Bulbophyllum cerebellum J.J.Verm. 1996
Bulbophyllum cerinum Schltr. 1913
Bulbophyllum ceriodorum Boiteau 1942
Bulbophyllum cernuum (Blume) Lindl. 1830: Nodding Bulbophyllum
Bulbophyllum chaetostroma Schltr. 1913
Bulbophyllum chalcochloron J.J.Verm. (2008).
Bulbophyllum chanii J.J.Verm. & A.L.Lamb 1991
Bulbophyllum chaunobulbon Schltr. 1913
Bulbophyllum cheiri Lindl. 1844
Bulbophyllum cheiri subsp. cheiri
Bulbophyllum cheiri subsp. subuliferum (Schltr.) J.J.Verm., P.O'Byrne & A.L.Lamb (2015)
Bulbophyllum cheiropetalum Ridl. 1926
Bulbophyllum × chikukwa Fibeck & Mavi (2000 publ. 2001).
Bulbophyllum chimaera Schltr. 1913: Chimarea Bulbophyllum
Bulbophyllum chinense (Lindl.) Rchb.f. in W.G.Walpers 1861
Bulbophyllum chloranthum Schltr. in K.M.Schumann & C.A.G.Lauterbach 1905: Green-blooming Bulbophyllum
Bulbophyllum chlorascens J.J.Sm. 1927
Bulbophyllum chloroglossum Rchb.f. 1871
Bulbophyllum chlorolirion J.J.Verm. (2008)
Bulbophyllum chloropterum Rchb.f. 1850
Bulbophyllum chlororhopalon Schltr. 1913
Bulbophyllum chondriophorum (Gagnep.) Seidenf. (1973 publ. 1974)
Bulbophyllum chrysanthum J.J.Verm. (2008)
Bulbophyllum chrysendetum Ames 1915
Bulbophyllum chrysocephalum Schltr. 1911
Bulbophyllum chrysochilum Schltr. 1912
Bulbophyllum chrysoglossum Schltr. in K.M.Schumann & C.A.G.Lauterbach 1905
Bulbophyllum chrysotes Schltr. 1913
Bulbophyllum chthonochroma J.J.Verm. & Sieder (2015)
Bulbophyllum ciliatilabrum H.Perrier 1937
Bulbophyllum ciliatum (Blume) Lindl. 1830
Bulbophyllum ciliipetalum Schltr. 1913
Bulbophyllum ciliolatum Schltr. 1913
Bulbophyllum ciluliae Bianch. & J.A.N.Bat. (2004)
Bulbophyllum cimicinum J.J.Verm. 1982
Bulbophyllum × cipoense Borba & Semir 1998
Bulbophyllum cirrhoglossum H.Perrier 1951
Bulbophyllum cirrhosum L.O.Williams 1940
Bulbophyllum citrellum Ridl. 1916
Bulbophyllum citricolor J.J.Sm. 1932
Bulbophyllum citrinilabre J.J.Sm. 1913
Bulbophyllum clandestinum Lindl. 1841: Close-sitting Bulbophyllum
Bulbophyllum claptonense (Rolfe) Rolfe (1905)
Bulbophyllum claussenii Rchb.f. 1846
Bulbophyllum clavatum Thouars 1822
Bulbophyllum clavuliflorum J.J.Verm. & A.L.Lamb (2008)
Bulbophyllum cleistogamum Ridl. 1896: Self-fertilizing Bulbophyllum
Bulbophyllum clemensiae Ames 1912
Bulbophyllum clemensiorum J.J.Verm., Schuit. & de Vogel (2014)
Bulbophyllum clinocoryphe J.J.Verm., P.O'Byrne & A.L.Lamb (2015)
Bulbophyllum clinopus J.J.Verm. & P.O'Byrne (2008)
Bulbophyllum clipeibulbum J.J.Verm. 2001
Bulbophyllum coccinatum H.Perrier 1938
Bulbophyllum cochleatum Lindl. 1862
Bulbophyllum cochleatum var. bequaertii (De Wild.) J.J.Verm. 1986
Bulbophyllum cochleatum var. brachyanthum (Summerh.) J.J.Verm. 1986
Bulbophyllum cochleatum var. cochleatum: Mann's Bulbophyllum
Bulbophyllum cochleatum var. tenuicaule (Lindl.) J.J.Verm. 1986
Bulbophyllum cochlia Garay, Hamer & Siegerist 1994
Bulbophyllum cochlioides J.J.Sm. 1929
Bulbophyllum cocoinum Bateman ex Lindl. 1837: Coconut Bulbophyllum
Bulbophyllum codonanthum Schltr. 1911
Bulbophyllum coelochilum J.J.Verm. 1991
Bulbophyllum cogniauxianum (Kraenzl.) J.J.Sm. 1912
Bulbophyllum coiloglossum Schltr. in K.M.Schumann & C.A.G.Lauterbach (1905)
Bulbophyllum collettii King & Pantl. 1897
Bulbophyllum colliferum J.J.Sm. 1911
Bulbophyllum collinum Schltr. 1913
Bulbophyllum coloratum J.J.Sm. 1910
Bulbophyllum colubrimodum Ames1923
Bulbophyllum colubrinum (Rchb.f.) Rchb.f. in W.G.Walpers 1861
Bulbophyllum comatum Lindl. 1862
Bulbophyllum comatum var. comatum
Bulbophyllum comatum var. inflatum (Rolfe) J.J.Verm. 1986
Bulbophyllum comberi J.J.Verm. in J.B.Comber 1990: Comber's Bulbophyllum
Bulbophyllum comberipictum J.J.Verm. 2002
Bulbophyllum cominsii Rolfe (1895)
Bulbophyllum commersonii Thouars 1822
Bulbophyllum commissibulbum J.J.Sm. 1929
Bulbophyllum comorianum H.Perrier 1938: Comoros Islands Bulbophyllum
Bulbophyllum comosum Collett & Hemsl. 1890
Bulbophyllum complanatum H.Perrier 1937
Bulbophyllum compressilabellatum P.Royen 1979
Bulbophyllum compressum Teijsm. & Binn. 1862
Bulbophyllum comptonii Rendle 1921
Bulbophyllum concatenatum P.J.Cribb & P.Taylor 1980
Bulbophyllum concavibasalis P.Royen 1979
Bulbophyllum concavilabium P.O'Byrne & P.T.Ong (2014)
Bulbophyllum conchidioides Ridl. 1886
Bulbophyllum conchophyllum J.J.Sm. 1912
Bulbophyllum concinnum Hook.f. 1890
Bulbophyllum concolor J.J.Sm. 1914
Bulbophyllum condensatum J.J.Verm. (2008)
Bulbophyllum condylochilum J.J.Verm. & P.O'Byrne (2008)
Bulbophyllum confragosum T.P.Lin & Y.N.Chang (2013)
Bulbophyllum congestiflorum Ridl. 1917
Bulbophyllum coniferum Ridl. 1909
Bulbophyllum connatum Carr 1933
Bulbophyllum consimile J.J.Verm. & P.O'Byrne (2008)
Bulbophyllum conspectum J.J.Sm. (1927)
Bulbophyllum conspersum J.J.Sm. 1913
Bulbophyllum contortisepalum J.J.Sm. 1912
Bulbophyllum cootesii M.A.Clem. (1999-2000 publ. 1999): Cootes' Bulbophyllum
Bulbophyllum corallinum Tixier & Guillaumin 1963
Bulbophyllum cordemoyi Frapp. ex Cordem. 1895
Bulbophyllum coriophorum Ridl. 1886: Bug-smelling Bulbophyllum
Bulbophyllum cornu-cervi King 1895
Bulbophyllum cornu-ovis Rysy (2011)
Bulbophyllum cornutum (Blume) Rchb.f. in W.G.Walpers 1861: Horned Bulbophyllum
Bulbophyllum corolliferum J.J.Sm. 1917
Bulbophyllum corrugatum J.J.Verm. (2008)
Bulbophyllum corticicola Schltr. (1910)
Bulbophyllum corythium N.Hall 1981
Bulbophyllum coweniorum J.J.Verm. & P.O'Byrne 2003: Cowen's Bulbophyllum
Bulbophyllum crabro (C.S.P.Parish & Rchb.f.) J.J.Verm., Schuit. & de Vogel (2014)
Bulbophyllum crassicaudatum Ames & C.Schweinf. in O.Ames (1920)
Bulbophyllum crassifolium Thwaites ex Trimen 1885: Thick-leafed Bulbophyllum
Bulbophyllum crassinervium J.J.Sm. 1900
Bulbophyllum crassipes Hook.f. 1890: Thick-spurred Bulbophyllum
Bulbophyllum crassipetalum H.Perrier 1937
Bulbophyllum crenilabium W.Kittr. (1984 publ. 1985).
Bulbophyllum crepidiferum J.J.Sm. 1920
Bulbophyllum croceodon J.J.Verm. & P.O'Byrne (2008).
Bulbophyllum croceum (Blume) Lindl. 1830: Saffron-yellow Bulbophyllum
Bulbophyllum crocodilus J.J.Sm. 1912
Bulbophyllum cruciatum J.J.Sm. 1911
Bulbophyllum cruciferum J.J.Sm. 1917
Bulbophyllum cruentum Garay, Hamer & Siegerist 1992: Blood-red Bulbophyllum
Bulbophyllum cruttwellii J.J.Verm. 1993
Bulbophyllum cryptanthoides J.J.Sm. 1912
Bulbophyllum cryptanthum Cogn. 1899
Bulbophyllum cryptophoranthus Garay 1999
Bulbophyllum cryptostachyum Schltr. 1924
Bulbophyllum cubicum Ames 1922
Bulbophyllum culex Ridl. 1916
Bulbophyllum cumberlegei (Seidenf.) J.J.Verm., Schuit. & de Vogel (2014)
Bulbophyllum cumingii (Lindl.) Rchb.f. in W.G.Walpers 1861
Bulbophyllum cuneatum Rolfe ex Ames 1905
Bulbophyllum cuniculiforme J.J.Sm. 1911
Bulbophyllum cupreum Lindl. 1838: Copper-colored Bulbophyllum
Bulbophyllum curranii Ames 1912
Bulbophyllum curvibulbum Frapp. ex Cordem. 1895
Bulbophyllum curvicaule Schltr. 1913
Bulbophyllum curvifolium Schltr. 1916
Bulbophyllum curvimentatum J.J.Verm. 1984
Bulbophyllum cuspidipetalum J.J.Sm. 1908: Lanceolate-leafed Bulbophyllum
Bulbophyllum cyanotriche J.J.Verm. 1996
Bulbophyllum cyatheicola (P.Royen) J.J.Verm., Schuit. & de Vogel (2014)
Bulbophyllum cyclanthum Schltr. 1916
Bulbophyllum cycloglossum Schltr. 1913
Bulbophyllum cyclopense J.J.Sm. 1912
Bulbophyllum cyclophoroides J.J.Sm. 1928
Bulbophyllum cyclophyllum Schltr. 1913
Bulbophyllum cylindraceum Wall. ex Lindl. 1830: Cylindrical Bulbophyllum
Bulbophyllum cylindricum King 1895
Bulbophyllum cylindrobulbum Schltr. in K.M.Schumann & C.A.G.Lauterbach 1905
Bulbophyllum cylindrocarpum Frapp. ex Cordem. 1895
Bulbophyllum cylindrocarpum var. andringitrense Bosser 2000
Bulbophyllum cylindrocarpum var. aurantiacum Frapp. ex Cordem. 1895
Bulbophyllum cylindrocarpum var. cylindrocarpum
Bulbophyllum cylindrocarpum var. olivaceum Frapp. ex Cordem. 1895
Bulbophyllum cymbidioides J.J.Verm. & P.O'Byrne (2008)
Bulbophyllum cymbochilum J.J.Verm. & P.O'Byrne (2008)
Bulbophyllum cyrtognomom J.J.Verm. & A.L.Lamb (2008)
Bulbophyllum cyrtophyllum J.J.Verm. (2008)

D
Bulbophyllum dacruzii Campacci (2010)
Bulbophyllum dalatense Gagnep. 1930
Bulbophyllum danii Perez-Vera 2003
Bulbophyllum dasypetalum Rolfe ex Ames 1905
Bulbophyllum dasystachys J.J.Verm. (2014)
Bulbophyllum davidii (Cootes & Boos) J.M.H.Shaw (2017)
Bulbophyllum dawongense J.J.Sm. 1934
Bulbophyllum dayanum Rchb.f. 1865: Day's Bulbophyllum
Bulbophyllum dearei (Rchb.f.) Rchb.f. 1888: Deare's Bulbophyllum
Bulbophyllum debile Bosser (1989 publ. 1990).
Bulbophyllum debrincatiae J.J.Verm. 2002
Bulbophyllum debruynii J.J.Sm. 1929
Bulbophyllum decarhopalon Schltr. 1913
Bulbophyllum decaryanum H.Perrier 1937: Decary's Bulbophyllum
Bulbophyllum decatriche J.J.Verm. 1991
Bulbophyllum decumbens Schltr. 1913
Bulbophyllum decurrentilobum J.J.Verm. & P.O'Byrne 2003
Bulbophyllum decurviscapum J.J.Sm. 1932: Pendant Bulbophyllum
Bulbophyllum decurvulum Schltr. 1912
Bulbophyllum dekockii J.J.Sm. 1911
Bulbophyllum delicatulum Schltr. 1911
Bulbophyllum delitescens Hance 1876
Bulbophyllum deltoideum Ames & C.Schweinf. in O.Ames 1920
Bulbophyllum deminutum J.J.Sm. 1927
Bulbophyllum dempoense J.J.Sm. 1920
Bulbophyllum dendrobioides J.J.Sm. 1913
Bulbophyllum dendrochiloides Schltr. 1913
Bulbophyllum dennisii J.J.Wood 1983: Dennis' Bulbophyllum
Bulbophyllum densibulbum W.Kittr. (1984 publ. [1985).
Bulbophyllum densifolium Schltr. 1913
Bulbophyllum densum Thouars 1822
Bulbophyllum denticulatum Rolfe 1891
Bulbophyllum dependens Schltr. 1913
Bulbophyllum depressum King & Pantl. 1897
Bulbophyllum desmotrichoides Schltr. 1913
Bulbophyllum deuterodischorense J.M.H.Shaw (2014)
Bulbophyllum deviantiae J.J.Verm. & P.O'Byrne (2008)
Bulbophyllum devium J.B.Comber 1990
Bulbophyllum devogelii J.J.Verm. 1991
Bulbophyllum dewildei J.J.Verm. 1996
Bulbophyllum dhaninivatii Seidenf. 1965
Bulbophyllum dianthum Schltr. 1911
Bulbophyllum dibothron J.J.Verm. & A.L.Lamb 1994
Bulbophyllum dichaeoides Schltr. 1913
Bulbophyllum dichilus Schltr. 1913
Bulbophyllum dichotomum J.J.Sm. 1908
Bulbophyllum dichromum Rolfe (1907)
Bulbophyllum dickasonii Seidenf. 1979
Bulbophyllum dictyoneuron Schltr. 1913
Bulbophyllum didymotropis Seidenf. 1979
Bulbophyllum digitatum J.J.Sm. (1911)
Bulbophyllum digoelense J.J.Sm. 1911
Bulbophyllum dijkstalianum (2010)
Bulbophyllum diplantherum Carr 1932
Bulbophyllum diplohelix J.J.Verm. & Rysy (2014)
Bulbophyllum dischidiifolium J.J.Sm. 1909
Bulbophyllum dischorense Schltr. 1913
Bulbophyllum disciflorum Rolfe (1895)
Bulbophyllum discilabium H.Perrier 1951
Bulbophyllum discolor Schltr. 1913
Bulbophyllum discolor subsp. cubitale J.J.Verm. 1993
Bulbophyllum discolor subsp. discolor
Bulbophyllum disjunctum Ames & C.Schweinf. in O.Ames 1920
Bulbophyllum dissitiflorum Seidenf. 1979
Bulbophyllum dissolutum Ames, Philipp. J. Sci., C 8: 4249 (1913 publ. 1914).
Bulbophyllum distichobulbum P.J.Cribb 1995
Bulbophyllum distichum Schltr. 1913
Bulbophyllum divaricatum H.Perrier 1937
Bulbophyllum divergens J.J.Verm. & P.O'Byrne (2011).
Bulbophyllum djamuense Schltr. 1913
Bulbophyllum dolabriforme J.J.Verm. 1987
Bulbophyllum dolichodon J.J.Verm., P.O'Byrne & A.L.Lamb (2015)
Bulbophyllum dolichoglottis Schltr. 1912
Bulbophyllum dolichopus J.J.Verm., Schuit. & de Vogel (2014)
Bulbophyllum doryphoroide Ames 1915
Bulbophyllum dracunculus J.J.Verm. 2000
Bulbophyllum dransfieldii J.J.Verm. 1991
Bulbophyllum drepananthum J.J.Verm., de Vogel & A.Vogel (2010).
Bulbophyllum drepanosepalum J.J.Verm. & P.O'Byrne 1993
Bulbophyllum dryadum Schltr. 1913
Bulbophyllum dryas Ridl. 1915
Bulbophyllum drymoda J.J.Verm., Schuit. & de Vogel (2014).
Bulbophyllum drymoglossum Maxim. 1887
Bulbophyllum dschischungarense Schltr. 1913
Bulbophyllum dulongjiangense X.H.Jin (2006).
Bulbophyllum dunstervillei Garay 1976
Bulbophyllum dusenii Kraenzl. 1911

E
Bulbophyllum ebracteolatum Kraenzl. 1916
Bulbophyllum echinochilum Kraenzl. 1921
Bulbophyllum echinolabium J.J.Sm. 1934
Bulbophyllum echinulus Seidenf. 1982:
Bulbophyllum eciliatum Schltr. 1913
Bulbophyllum ecornutoides Cootes & W.Suarez (2006)
Bulbophyllum ecornutum (J.J.Sm.) J.J.Sm. 1914
Bulbophyllum ecornutum subsp. ecornutum
Bulbophyllum ecornutum subsp. verrucatum J.J.Verm., P.O'Byrne & A.L.Lamb (2015)
Bulbophyllum ecristatum J.J.Verm. & P.O'Byrne (2008)
Bulbophyllum edentatum H.Perrier 1937
Bulbophyllum efferatum J.J.Verm. & P.O'Byrne (2011)
Bulbophyllum elachanthe J.J.Verm. 1991
Bulbophyllum elaphoglossum Schltr. 1911
Bulbophyllum elasmatopus Schltr. in K.M.Schumann & C.A.G.Lauterbach 1905
Bulbophyllum elassoglossum Siegerist 1991
Bulbophyllum elassonotum Summerh. 1935: minuscule nodes bulbophyllum
Bulbophyllum elatum (Hook.f.) J.J.Sm. 1912
Bulbophyllum elegans Gardner ex Thwaites 1861
Bulbophyllum elegantius Schltr. 1913
Bulbophyllum elegantulum (Rolfe) J.J.Sm. 1912
Bulbophyllum eleiosurum J.J.Verm., P.O'Byrne & A.L.Lamb (2015)
Bulbophyllum elephantinum J.J.Sm. 1913
Bulbophyllum elevatopunctatum J.J.Sm. 1920: raised dot bulbophyllum
Bulbophyllum elisae (F.Muell.) Benth. 1871 – pineapple orchid
Bulbophyllum elliae Rchb.f. in W.G.Walpers 1861
Bulbophyllum elliottii Rolfe 1891
Bulbophyllum ellipticifolium J.J.Sm. 1935
Bulbophyllum ellipticum Schltr. 1913
Bulbophyllum elmeri Ames 1912
Bulbophyllum elodeiflorum J.J.Sm. 1912
Bulbophyllum elongatum (Blume) Hassk. 1844
Bulbophyllum emarginatum (Finet) J.J.Sm. 1912
Bulbophyllum emunitum J.J.Verm. & A.L.Lamb (2008)
Bulbophyllum encephalodes Summerh. 1951
Bulbophyllum endotrachys Schltr. 1913
Bulbophyllum entobaptum J.J.Verm. & P.O'Byrne (2008)
Bulbophyllum entomonopsis J.J.Verm. & P.O'Byrne 1993
Bulbophyllum epapillosum Schltr. 1913
Bulbophyllum epibulbon Schltr. 1913
Bulbophyllum epicranthes Hook.f. 1890
Bulbophyllum epicranthes var. epicranthes
Bulbophyllum epicranthes var. sumatranum (J.J.Sm.) J.J.Verm. 1982
Bulbophyllum epiphytum Barb.Rodr. 1877
Bulbophyllum erectum Thouars 1822
Bulbophyllum ericssonii Kraenzl. (1893)
Bulbophyllum erinaceum Schltr. 1913
Bulbophyllum erioides Schltr. in K.M.Schumann & C.A.G.Lauterbach 1905
Bulbophyllum erosimarginatum Cootes, W.Suarez & Boos (2011)
Bulbophyllum erosipetalum C.Schweinf. 1951
Bulbophyllum erratum Ames 1922
Bulbophyllum erythroglossum Bosser 2000
Bulbophyllum erythrokyle J.J.Verm., Schuit. & de Vogel (2014)
Bulbophyllum erythrosema J.J.Verm. (2008)
Bulbophyllum erythrostachyum Rolfe 1903
Bulbophyllum erythrostictum Ormerod (2005)
Bulbophyllum escritorii Ames 1915
Bulbophyllum eublepharum Rchb.f. in W.G.Walpers 1861
Bulbophyllum eutoreton J.J.Verm. (2008)
Bulbophyllum evansii M.R.Hend. 1927: Evans' Bulbophyllum
Bulbophyllum evasum T.E.Hunt & Rupp 1950 – creeping  brittle orchid
Bulbophyllum evrardii Gagnep. 1930: Evrard's Bulbophyllum
Bulbophyllum exaltatum Lindl. 1842
Bulbophyllum exasperatum Schltr. 1913
Bulbophyllum exiguiflorum Schltr. 1913
Bulbophyllum exiguum F.Muell. 1860 – tiny strand orchid
Bulbophyllum exile Ames 1908
Bulbophyllum exilipes Schltr. 1913
Bulbophyllum expallidum J.J.Verm. 1984
Bulbophyllum exquisitum Ames 1923

F
Bulbophyllum facetum Garay, Hamer & Siegerist 1996
Bulbophyllum falcatocaudatum J.J.Sm. 1914
Bulbophyllum falcatum (Lindl.) Rchb.f. in W.G.Walpers 1861
Bulbophyllum falcatum var. bufo (Lindl.) Govaerts 1996
Bulbophyllum falcatum var. falcatum
Bulbophyllum falcatum var. velutinum (Lindl.) J.J.Verm. 1992
Bulbophyllum falcibracteum Schltr. 1923
Bulbophyllum falciferum J.J.Sm. 1910
Bulbophyllum falcifolium Schltr. 1913
Bulbophyllum falcipetalum Lindl. 1862
Bulbophyllum falculicorne J.J.Sm. 1945
Bulbophyllum fallacinum J.J.Verm. (2008)
Bulbophyllum fallax Rolfe 1889
Bulbophyllum farinulentum J.J.Sm. 1920
Bulbophyllum farinulentum subsp. densissimum (Carr) J.J.Verm. 2002
Bulbophyllum farinulentum subsp. farinulentum
Bulbophyllum farreri (W.W.Sm.) Seidenf. (1973 publ. 1974).
Bulbophyllum fasciatum Schltr. 1912
Bulbophyllum fasciculatum Schltr. 1913
Bulbophyllum fasciculiferum Schltr. 1923
Bulbophyllum fascinator (Rolfe) Rolfe 1908
Bulbophyllum fayi J.J.Verm. 1992
Bulbophyllum fendlerianum E.C.Smidt & P.J.Cribb (2008)
Bulbophyllum fenestratum J.J.Sm. (1907)
Bulbophyllum fengianum (Ormerod) J.J.Verm. (2014)
Bulbophyllum fenixii Ames, Philipp. J. Sci., C 8: 430 (1913 publ. 1914).
Bulbophyllum ferkoanum Schltr. 1918
Bulbophyllum fibratum (Gagnep.) T.B.Nguyen & D.H.Duong in T.B.Nguyen (ed.) 1984
Bulbophyllum fibrinum J.J.Sm. 1913
Bulbophyllum fibristectum J.J.Verm. (2008)
Bulbophyllum filamentosum Schltr. 1913
Bulbophyllum filicaule J.J.Sm. 1913
Bulbophyllum filifolium Borba & E.C.Smidt 2004
Bulbophyllum filovagans Carr 1933
Bulbophyllum fimbriatum (Lindl.) Rchb.f. in W.G.Walpers 1861
Bulbophyllum fimbriperianthium W.M.Lin, Kuo Huang & T.P.Lin (2006)
Bulbophyllum finisterrae Schltr. 1913
Bulbophyllum fionae J.J.Verm. & P.O'Byrne (2008)
Bulbophyllum fischeri Seidenf. (1973 publ. 1974): Fischer's Bulbophyllum
Bulbophyllum fissibrachium J.J.Sm. 1927
Bulbophyllum fissipetalum Schltr. 1913
Bulbophyllum flabellum-veneris (J.König) Aver. 2003
Bulbophyllum flagellare Schltr. 1913
Bulbophyllum flammuliferum Ridl. 1898: Flame-carrying Bulbophyllum
Bulbophyllum flavescens (Blume) Lindl. 1830
Bulbophyllum flavicolor J.J.Sm. 1929
Bulbophyllum flavidiflorum Carr 1933
Bulbophyllum flaviflorum (Tang, S.Liu & H.Y.Su) Seidenf. (1972 publ. 1973).
Bulbophyllum flavofimbriatum J.J.Sm. 1931
Bulbophyllum flavum Schltr. 1913
Bulbophyllum fletcherianum Rolfe 1911: Fletcher's Bulbophyllum, Spies' Bulbophyllum
Bulbophyllum flexuosum Schltr. 1913
Bulbophyllum floribundum J.J.Sm. 1912
Bulbophyllum florulentum Schltr. 1924
Bulbophyllum foetidilabrum Ormerod 2001
Bulbophyllum foetidum Schltr. 1913
Bulbophyllum foetidum var. foetidum
Bulbophyllum foetidum var. grandiflorum J.J.Sm. 1929
Bulbophyllum folliculiferum J.J.Sm. 1914
Bulbophyllum fonsflorum J.J.Verm. 1990
Bulbophyllum foraminiferum J.J.Verm. 1996
Bulbophyllum fordii (Rolfe) J.J.Sm. 1912
Bulbophyllum forrestii Seidenf. (1973 publ. 1974).
Bulbophyllum forsythianum Kraenzl. 1899
Bulbophyllum fossatum J.J.Verm. & P.O'Byrne (2011)
Bulbophyllum fractiflexum J.J.Sm. 1908
Bulbophyllum fractiflexum subsp. fractiflexum
Bulbophyllum fractiflexum subsp. solomonense J.J.Verm. & B.A.Lewis 1991
Bulbophyllum fragosum J.J.Verm. & A.L.Lamb (2013)
Bulbophyllum francoisii H.Perrier 1937
Bulbophyllum francoisii var. andrangense (H.Perrier) Bosser 1965
Bulbophyllum francoisii var. francoisii
Bulbophyllum fraternum J.J.Verm. & P.O'Byrne (2008)
Bulbophyllum freyi V.P.Castro & Speckm. (2012)
Bulbophyllum fritillariiflorum J.J.Sm. 1912: Fritillaria-like Bulbophyllum
Bulbophyllum frostii Summerh. 1928
Bulbophyllum frustrans J.J.Sm. 1911
Bulbophyllum fruticicola Schltr. in K.M.Schumann & C.A.G.Lauterbach 1905
Bulbophyllum fruticulum J.J.Verm. (2008)
Bulbophyllum fukuyamae Tuyama 1941
Bulbophyllum fulgens J.J.Verm. 1996
Bulbophyllum fulvibulbum J.J.Verm. 1991
Bulbophyllum funingense Z.H.Tsi & H.C.Chen 1981
Bulbophyllum furcatum Aver. 2003
Bulbophyllum furcillatum J.J.Verm. & P.O'Byrne 2003
Bulbophyllum fuscatum Schltr. 1913
Bulbophyllum fusciflorum Schltr. 1913
Bulbophyllum fuscopurpureum Wight 1851
Bulbophyllum fuscum Lindl. 1839
Bulbophyllum fuscum var. fuscum
Bulbophyllum fuscum var. melinostachyum (Schltr.) J.J.Verm. 1986
Bulbophyllum futile J.J.Sm. 1908

G
Bulbophyllum gadgarrense Rupp 1949 – tangled rope orchid
Bulbophyllum gajoense J.J.Sm. 1943
Bulbophyllum galactanthum Schltr. 1921
Bulbophyllum galliaheneum P.Royen 1979
Bulbophyllum gamandrum J.J.Verm. & P.O'Byrne (2008)
Bulbophyllum gamblei (Hook.f.) Hook.f. 1890: Gamble's Bulbophyllum
Bulbophyllum gautierense J.J.Sm. 1912
Bulbophyllum gehrtii E.C.Smidt & Borba (2009)
Bulbophyllum gemma-reginae J.J.Verm. 1996
Bulbophyllum geniculiferum J.J.Sm. 1912
Bulbophyllum geraense Rchb.f. in W.G.Walpers 1864
Bulbophyllum gerlandianum Kraenzl. 1886
Bulbophyllum gibbolabium Seidenf. 1979: Hump-lipped Bulbophyllum
Bulbophyllum gibbosum (Blume) Lindl. 1830: Humped Bulbophyllum
Bulbophyllum gilgianum Kraenzl. 1899
Bulbophyllum gilvum J.J.Verm. & A.L.Lamb 1994
Bulbophyllum gimagaanense Ames 1912
Bulbophyllum giriwoense J.J.Sm. 1914
Bulbophyllum gjellerupii J.J.Sm. 1929
Bulbophyllum glabrichelia Aver. (2017)
Bulbophyllum glabrum Schltr. 1913
Bulbophyllum gladiatum Lindl. 1842
Bulbophyllum glanduliferum Schltr. 1913
Bulbophyllum glandulosum Ames 1923
Bulbophyllum glaucifolium J.J.Verm. 1991
Bulbophyllum glaucum Schltr. 1913
Bulbophyllum glebodactylum (W.Suarez & Cootes) Sieder & Kiehn (2010 publ. 2011)
Bulbophyllum glebulosum J.J.Verm. & Cootes (2008)
Bulbophyllum globiceps Schltr. in K.M.Schumann & C.A.G.Lauterbach 1905
Bulbophyllum globuliforme Nicholls 1938 
Bulbophyllum globulosum (Ridl.) Schuit. & de Vogel 2003
Bulbophyllum globulus Hook.f. 1890
Bulbophyllum glutinosum (Barb.Rodr.) Cogn. in C.F.P.von Martius 1902
Bulbophyllum gnomoniferum Ames 1908
Bulbophyllum gobiense Schltr. 1912
Bulbophyllum gofferjei J.J.Verm. & A.L.Lamb (2013)
Bulbophyllum goliathense J.J.Sm. 1911
Bulbophyllum gomphreniflorum J.J.Sm. 1918
Bulbophyllum gongshanense Z.H.Tsi 1981
Bulbophyllum goniopterum J.J.Verm., P.O'Byrne & A.L.Lamb, (2015)
Bulbophyllum gracile Thouars 1822
Bulbophyllum gracilipes King & Pantl. 1896
Bulbophyllum graciliscapum Schltr. in K.M.Schumann & C.A.G.Lauterbach 1905
Bulbophyllum gracillimum (Rolfe) Rolfe 1907 – wispy umbrella orchid
Bulbophyllum gramineum Ridl. 1916
Bulbophyllum grammopoma J.J.Verm. 1991
Bulbophyllum grandiflorum Blume 1849
Bulbophyllum grandifolium Schltr. 1913
Bulbophyllum grandilabre Carr 1932
Bulbophyllum grandimesense B.Gray & D.L.Jones 1989 – pale rope orchid
Bulbophyllum granulosum Barb.Rodr. 1877
Bulbophyllum graveolens (F.M.Bailey) J.J.Sm. 1912
Bulbophyllum gravidum Lindl. 1862
Bulbophyllum griffithii (Lindl.) Rchb.f. in W.G.Walpers 1861: Griffith's Bulbophyllum
Bulbophyllum groeneveldtii J.J.Sm. 1920
Bulbophyllum grotianum J.J.Verm. 2002
Bulbophyllum grudense J.J.Sm. 1905
Bulbophyllum guamense Ames 1914
Bulbophyllum × guartelae Mancinelli & E.C.Smidt (2012)
Bulbophyllum gunnarii Aver. (2005)
Bulbophyllum gusdorfii J.J.Sm. 1917
Bulbophyllum guttatum Schltr. 1913
Bulbophyllum guttifilum Seidenf. 1996
Bulbophyllum guttulatoides Aver. (2005)
Bulbophyllum guttulatum (Hook.f.) N.P.Balakr. 1970: Small-spotted Bulbophyllum
Bulbophyllum gyaloglossum J.J.Verm. 1993
Bulbophyllum gymnopus Hook.f. 1890
Bulbophyllum gyrochilum Seidenf. 1979

H
Bulbophyllum habbemense P.Royen 1979
Bulbophyllum habrotinum J.J.Verm. & A.L.Lamb 1994
Bulbophyllum haematostictum J.J.Verm. & A.L.Lamb (2008)
Bulbophyllum hahlianum Schltr. in K.M.Schumann & C.A.G.Lauterbach 1905
Bulbophyllum hainanense Z.H.Tsi 1981
Bulbophyllum halconense Ames 1907
Bulbophyllum hamadryas Schltr. 1913
Bulbophyllum hamatipes J.J.Sm. 1918
Bulbophyllum hamelinii W.Watson 1893
Bulbophyllum hampeliae Cootes, R.Boos & Naive (2016)
Bulbophyllum hampelianum J.M.H.Shaw (2017)
Bulbophyllum haniffii Carr 1932
Bulbophyllum hans-meyeri J.J.Wood 1981
Bulbophyllum hapalanthos Garay 1999
Bulbophyllum hassallii Kores 1989
Bulbophyllum hastiferum Schltr. 1911
Bulbophyllum hatschbachianum E.C.Smidt & Borba (2008)
Bulbophyllum hatusimanum Tuyama 1940
Bulbophyllum heldiorum J.J.Verm. 1991
Bulbophyllum helenae (Kuntze) J.J.Sm. 1912
Bulbophyllum hellwigianum Kraenzl. ex Warb. 1893
Bulbophyllum hemiprionotum J.J.Verm. & A.L.Lamb 1994
Bulbophyllum hemisterranthum J.J.Verm. & P.O'Byrne (2008)
Bulbophyllum henanense J.L.Lu 1992
Bulbophyllum hengstumianum J.J.Verm., de Vogel & A.Vogel (2010)
Bulbophyllum henrici Schltr. 1924
Bulbophyllum henrici var. henrici
Bulbophyllum henrici var. rectangulare H.Perrier ex Hermans (2007)
Bulbophyllum herbula Frapp. ex Cordem. 1895
Bulbophyllum hermonii (P.J.Cribb & B.A.Lewis) J.J.Verm., Schuit. & de Vogel (2015)
Bulbophyllum heteroblepharon Schltr. 1913
Bulbophyllum heterorhopalon Schltr. 1913
Bulbophyllum heterosepalum Schltr. 1913
Bulbophyllum hexarhopalon Schltr. 1906
Bulbophyllum hexurum Schltr. 1913
Bulbophyllum hians Schltr. 1913
Bulbophyllum hiepii Aver. 1992
Bulbophyllum hildebrandtii Rchb.f. 1881
Bulbophyllum hiljeae J.J.Verm. 1991
Bulbophyllum himantosepalum J.J.Verm. & Sieder (2015)
Bulbophyllum hirsutissimum Kraenzl. 1912
Bulbophyllum hirsutiusculum H.Perrier 1937
Bulbophyllum hirtulum Ridl. 1900
Bulbophyllum hirtum (Sm.) Lindl. 1830
Bulbophyllum hirudiniferum J.J.Verm. 1982
Bulbophyllum hirundinis (Gagnep.) Seidenf. (1973 publ. 1974)
Bulbophyllum histrionicum Rchb.f. ex G.A.Fisch. & P.J.Cribb (2009)
Bulbophyllum hodgsonii M.R.Hend. 1927
Bulbophyllum hoehnei E.C.Smidt & Borba (2007)
Bulbophyllum hollandianum J.J.Sm. 1913
Bulbophyllum holochilum J.J.Sm. 1912
Bulbophyllum horizontale Bosser 1965
Bulbophyllum horridulum J.J.Verm. 1986
Bulbophyllum hortorum J.J.Verm., P.O'Byrne & A.L.Lamb (2015)
Bulbophyllum hovarum Schltr. 1924
Bulbophyllum howcroftii Garay, Hamer & Siegerist 1995
Bulbophyllum hoyifolium J.J.Verm. 1993
Bulbophyllum huangshanense Y.M.Hu & X.H.Jin (2015)
Bulbophyllum humbertii Schltr. 1922
Bulbophyllum humblotii Rolfe 1891
Bulbophyllum humile Schltr. 1913
Bulbophyllum hyalinum Schltr. 1924
Bulbophyllum hyalosemoides J.J.Verm. & P.O'Byrne (2011)
Bulbophyllum hydrophilum J.J.Sm. 1905
Bulbophyllum hymenanthum Hook.f. 1890
Bulbophyllum hymenochilum Kraenzl. 1904
Bulbophyllum hyposiphon J.J.Verm. & A.L.Lamb (2013)
Bulbophyllum hyption J.J.Verm., P.O'Byrne & A.L.Lamb (2015)
Bulbophyllum hystricinum Schltr. 1913

I
Bulbophyllum ialibuense Ormerod 2002
Bulbophyllum ichthyosme J.J.Verm. (2008)
Bulbophyllum icteranthum Schltr. 1913
Bulbophyllum idenburgense J.J.Sm. 1929
Bulbophyllum igneum J.J.Sm. 1913
Bulbophyllum ignevenosum Carr 1930
Bulbophyllum ignobile J.J.Sm. 1934
Bulbophyllum ikongoense H.Perrier 1937
Bulbophyllum illecebrum J.J.Verm. & P.O'Byrne 2003
Bulbophyllum imbricans J.J.Sm. 1912

Bulbophyllum imbricatum Lindl. 1841
Bulbophyllum imerinense Schltr. 1925
Bulbophyllum imitator J.J.Verm. 1992
Bulbophyllum impar Ridl. 1917
Bulbophyllum inacootesiae Cootes, M.Leon & Naive (2016)
Bulbophyllum inaequale (Blume) Lindl. 1830
Bulbophyllum inaequisepalum Schltr. 1923
Bulbophyllum inauditum Schltr. 1913
Bulbophyllum incarum Kraenzl. 1905: Incan Bulbophyllum
Bulbophyllum inciferum J.J.Verm. 1993
Bulbophyllum incisilabrum J.J.Verm. & P.O'Byrne 2003
Bulbophyllum inclinatum J.J.Sm. 1935
Bulbophyllum incommodum Kores 1989
Bulbophyllum inconspicuum Maxim. 1887
Bulbophyllum incumbens Schltr. 1913
Bulbophyllum incurvum Thouars 1822
Bulbophyllum indragiriense Schltr. (1906)
Bulbophyllum iners Rchb.f. 1880
Bulbophyllum infundibuliforme J.J.Sm. 1900
Bulbophyllum infundibuliforme subsp. hymenobracteatum (Schltr.) De Witte & J.J.Verm. (2010)
Bulbophyllum infundibuliforme subsp. infundibuliforme
Bulbophyllum inhaiense V.P.Castro & K.G.Lacerda (2009)
Bulbophyllum injoloense De Wild. 1916
Bulbophyllum injoloense subsp. injoloense
Bulbophyllum injoloense subsp. pseudoxypterum (J.J.Verm.) J.J.Verm. 1986Bulbophyllum inops Rchb.f. 1880Bulbophyllum inornatum J.J.Verm. 1987Bulbophyllum inquirendum J.J.Verm. 1993Bulbophyllum insectiferum Barb.Rodr. 1882Bulbophyllum insipidum J.J.Verm. & P.O'Byrne (2008)Bulbophyllum insolitum Bosser 1971Bulbophyllum insulsoides Seidenf. 1974)Bulbophyllum intermedium F.M.Bailey 1901Bulbophyllum interpositum J.J.Verm., Schuit. & de Vogel (2015)Bulbophyllum intertextum Lindl. 1862Bulbophyllum intonsum J.J.Verm. (2008)Bulbophyllum intricatum Seidenf. 1979: Intricate BulbophyllumBulbophyllum inversum Schltr. 1913Bulbophyllum invisum Ames 1922Bulbophyllum involutum Borba. Semir & F.Barros 1998Bulbophyllum ionophyllum J.J.Verm. 1991Bulbophyllum ipanemense Hoehne 1938: Ipanema BulbophyllumBulbophyllum ischnobasis J.J.Verm., P.O'Byrne & A.L.Lamb (2015)Bulbophyllum ischnopus Schltr. in K.M.Schumann & C.A.G.Lauterbach 1905Bulbophyllum iterans J.J.Verm. & P.O'Byrne 2003Bulbophyllum ivorense P.J.Cribb & Perez-Vera 1975

JBulbophyllum jaapii Szlach. & Olszewski 2001Bulbophyllum jackyi G.A.Fisch., Sieder & P.J.Cribb (2007)Bulbophyllum jainii (Hynn. & Malhotra) J.J.Verm., Schuit. & de Vogel (2014)Bulbophyllum jamaicense Cogn. 1909Bulbophyllum janus J.J.Verm. 2002Bulbophyllum japonicum (Makino) Makino 1910Bulbophyllum jayi J.J.Verm. & A.L.Lamb (2013)Bulbophyllum jiewhoei J.J.Verm. & P.O'Byrne 2000Bulbophyllum johannis H.Wendl. & Kraenzl. 1894Bulbophyllum johannulii J.J.Verm. 1982Bulbophyllum johnsonii T.E.Hunt 1950 – yellow snake orchidBulbophyllum jolandae J.J.Verm. 1991Bulbophyllum jonpetri J.J.Verm. & A.L.Lamb (2013)Bulbophyllum josephi (Kuntze) Summerh. 1945Bulbophyllum josephi var. josephiBulbophyllum josephi var. mahonii (Rolfe) J.J.Verm. 1986Bulbophyllum josii J.J.Verm. & P.O'Byrne (2011)Bulbophyllum jumelleanum Schltr. 1913

KBulbophyllum kachinense (Seidenf.) J.J.Verm., Schuit. & de Vogel (2014)Bulbophyllum kainochiloides H.Perrier 1937Bulbophyllum kaitiense Rchb.f. in W.G.Walpers 1861Bulbophyllum kanburiense Seidenf. 1970Bulbophyllum kaniense Schltr. 1913Bulbophyllum kapitense J.J.Verm., P.O'Byrne & A.L.Lamb (2015)Bulbophyllum karenkoensis T.P.Lin, Taiwania (2016)Bulbophyllum karenkoensis var. karenkoensisBulbophyllum karenkoensis var. puniceum (T.P.Lin & Y.N.Chang) T.P.Lin (2016)Bulbophyllum kauloense Schltr. 1913Bulbophyllum kautskyi Toscano 2000Bulbophyllum keekee N.Hall 1977Bulbophyllum kegelii Hamer & Garay (1995 publ. 1997).Bulbophyllum kelelense Schltr. 1913Bulbophyllum kempfii Schltr. 1921Bulbophyllum kemulense J.J.Sm. 1931Bulbophyllum kenae J.J.Verm. 1993Bulbophyllum kenchungianum P.O'Byrne & Gokusing (2016)Bulbophyllum kenejianum Schltr. (1913)Bulbophyllum keralense M.Kumar & Sequiera 2001Bulbophyllum kermesinostriatum (J.J.Sm.) J.J.Verm., Schuit. & de Vogel (2014)Bulbophyllum kermesinum Ridl. 1889Bulbophyllum kestron J.J.Verm. & A.L.Lamb 1988Bulbophyllum khaoyaiense Seidenf. 1970Bulbophyllum khasyanum Griff. 1851Bulbophyllum kiamfeeanum J.J.Verm. & P.O'Byrne (2008)Bulbophyllum kieneri Bosser 1971Bulbophyllum kingii Hook.f. (1890)Bulbophyllum kipgenii (Kishor, Chowlu & Vij) J.J.Verm., Schuit. & de Vogel 104 (2014)Bulbophyllum kirroanthum Schltr. 1911Bulbophyllum kittredgei (Garay, Hamer & Siegerist) J.J.Verm. (1996)Bulbophyllum kivuense J.J.Verm. 1986Bulbophyllum kjellbergii J.J.Sm. 1933Bulbophyllum klabatense Schltr. 1911Bulbophyllum klabatense subsp. klabatense]]
Bulbophyllum klabatense subsp. sulawesii (Garay, Hamer & Siegerist) J.J.Verm. & P.O'Byrne (2011)
Bulbophyllum koilobasis J.J.Verm., P.O'Byrne & A.L.Lamb (2015)
Bulbophyllum kontumense Gagnep. 1950
Bulbophyllum korimense J.J.Sm. 1929
Bulbophyllum korinchense Ridl. 1917
Bulbophyllum korthalsii Schltr. 1907
Bulbophyllum kuanwuense S.W.Chung & T.C.Hsu (2006)
Bulbophyllum kubahense J.J.Verm. & A.L.Lamb (2011)
Bulbophyllum kupense P.J.Cribb & B.J.Pollard 2004
Bulbophyllum kusaiense Tuyama 1940
Bulbophyllum kwangtungense Schltr. 1924

L
Bulbophyllum labatii Bosser 2004
Bulbophyllum laciniatum (Barb.Rodr.) Cogn. in C.F.P.von Martius 1902: Small-tipped Bulbophyllum
Bulbophyllum lacinulosum J.J.Sm. 1927
Bulbophyllum laetum J.J.Verm. 1996
Bulbophyllum lagaroglossum J.J.Verm. (2008)
Bulbophyllum lagaropetalum J.J.Verm., Schuit. & de Vogel (2014)
Bulbophyllum lagarophyllum J.J.Verm., Schuit. & de Vogel (2014)
Bulbophyllum lageniforme F.M.Bailey 1904
Bulbophyllum lakatoense Bosser 1969
Bulbophyllum lambii J.J.Verm. 1991
Bulbophyllum lamelluliferum J.J.Sm. 1913
Bulbophyllum lamii J.J.Sm. 1929
Bulbophyllum lamingtonense D.L.Jones 1993 – cream rope orchid
Bulbophyllum lancifolium Ames 1912
Bulbophyllum lancilabium Ames 1915
Bulbophyllum lancipetalum Ames 1912
Bulbophyllum lancisepalum H.Perrier 1938
Bulbophyllum languidum J.J.Sm. 1922
Bulbophyllum lanuginosum J.J.Verm. 2002
Bulbophyllum laoticum Gagnep. 1930: Laotian Bulbophyllum
Bulbophyllum lasianthum Lindl. 1855
Bulbophyllum lasiochilum C.S.P.Parish & Rchb.f. 1874
Bulbophyllum lasiogaster J.J.Verm. & P.O'Byrne (2011)
Bulbophyllum lasioglossum Rolfe ex Ames 1905
Bulbophyllum lasiopetalum Kraenzl. 1916
Bulbophyllum latibrachiatum J.J.Sm. 1908
Bulbophyllum latibrachiatum var. epilosum J.J.Sm. 1913
Bulbophyllum latibrachiatum var. latibrachiatum
Bulbophyllum latipes J.J.Sm. 1935
Bulbophyllum latipetalum H.Perrier 1951
Bulbophyllum latisepalum Ames & C.Schweinf. in O.Ames 1920
Bulbophyllum laxiflorum (Blume) Lindl. 1830
Bulbophyllum laxum Schltr. in K.M.Schumann & C.A.G.Lauterbach 1905
Bulbophyllum leandrianum H.Perrier 1937
Bulbophyllum lecouflei Bosser 1989
Bulbophyllum ledungense Tang & F.T.Wang 1974
Bulbophyllum lehmannianum Kraenzl. 1899
Bulbophyllum leibergii Ames & Rolfe in O.Ames 1915
Bulbophyllum leion J.J.Verm., Schuit. & de Vogel (2014)
Bulbophyllum lemnifolium Schltr. 1913
Bulbophyllum lemniscatoides Rolfe 1890: lemniscatum-like bulbophyllum
Bulbophyllum lemniscatoides var. exappendiculatum 1920
Bulbophyllum lemniscatoides var. lemniscatoides
Bulbophyllum lemniscatum C.S.P.Parish ex Hook.f. 1872
Bulbophyllum lemuraeoides H.Perrier (1937)
Bulbophyllum lemurense Bosser & P.J.Cribb in D.J.Du Puy & al. 1999
Bulbophyllum leniae J.J.Verm. 1991
Bulbophyllum leonii Kraenzl. 1899
Bulbophyllum leontoglossum Schltr. 1913
Bulbophyllum leopardinum (Wall.) Lindl. in N.Wallich 1829: leopard-spotted bulbophyllum
Bulbophyllum lepantense Ames 1912
Bulbophyllum lepanthiflorum Schltr. 1913
Bulbophyllum lepidum (Blume) J.J.Sm. (1905)
Bulbophyllum leproglossum J.J.Verm. & A.L.Lamb 1988
Bulbophyllum leptanthum Hook.f. 1890
Bulbophyllum leptobulbon J.J.Verm. 1996
Bulbophyllum leptocaulon Kraenzl. 1916
Bulbophyllum leptochlamys Schltr. 1924
Bulbophyllum leptoflorum P.O'Byrne & P.T.Ong (2014)
Bulbophyllum leptoglossum J.J.Verm. & A.L.Lamb (2008)
Bulbophyllum leptoleucum Schltr. 1913
Bulbophyllum leptophyllum W.Kittr. (1984 publ. 1985).
Bulbophyllum leptopus Schltr. in K.M.Schumann & C.A.G.Lauterbach 1905
Bulbophyllum leptosepalum Hook.f. 1890
Bulbophyllum leptostachyum Schltr. 1922
Bulbophyllum leptotriche J.J.Verm., Schuit. & de Vogel (2014)
Bulbophyllum leucoglossum Schuit., Juswara & Droissart (2016)
Bulbophyllum leucorhachis (Rolfe) Schltr. (1905)
Bulbophyllum leucorhodum Schltr. 1913
Bulbophyllum leucothyrsus Schltr. 1913: white-flowered bunch bulbophyllum
Bulbophyllum levanae Ames 1915: Levan's bulbophyllum
Bulbophyllum levanae var. giganteum Quisumb. & C.Schweinf. 1953
Bulbophyllum levatii Kraenzl. 1929
Bulbophyllum levatii subsp. levatii
Bulbophyllum levatii subsp. mischanthum J.J.Verm. 1993
Bulbophyllum leve Schltr. 1913
Bulbophyllum levidense J.J.Sm. 1929
Bulbophyllum levyae Garay, Hamer & Siegerist 1995: 
Bulbophyllum lewisense B.Gray & D.L.Jones 1989 – Mount Lewis rope orchid
Bulbophyllum leysianum Burb. (1895)
Bulbophyllum leytense Ames 1915
Bulbophyllum lichenoides Schltr. 1913
Bulbophyllum lichenophylax Schltr. 1924
Bulbophyllum ligulatum W.Kittr. (1984 publ. 1985).
Bulbophyllum ligulifolium J.J.Sm. 1934
Bulbophyllum lilacinum Ridl. 1897:
Bulbophyllum lilianae Rendle 1917 – warty strand orchid
Bulbophyllum limbatum Lindl. 1840
Bulbophyllum lindleyanum Griff. 1851: 
Bulbophyllum lineare Frapp. ex Cordem. 1895
Bulbophyllum lineariflorum J.J.Sm. 1911
Bulbophyllum linearifolium King & Pantl. 1897
Bulbophyllum linearilabium J.J.Sm. 1912
Bulbophyllum lineariligulatum Schltr. 1924
Bulbophyllum lineatum (Teijsm. & Binn.) J.J.Sm. 1912
Bulbophyllum lineolatum Schltr. 1913
Bulbophyllum linggense J.J.Sm. 1922
Bulbophyllum lingulatum Rendle 1921
Bulbophyllum lingulatum f. lingulatum
Bulbophyllum lingulatum f. microphyton (Guillaumin) N.Hall 1977
Bulbophyllum liparidioides Schltr. 1924
Bulbophyllum lipense Ames 1923
Bulbophyllum lissoglossum J.J.Verm. 1991: smooth-lipped bulbophyllum
Bulbophyllum lizae J.J.Verm. 1984
Bulbophyllum lobbii Lindl. 1847: Lobb's Bulbophyllum, Thailand Bulbophyllum, Sumatran Bulbophyllum

Bulbophyllum lobbii subsp. boreoborneense Mangal, F.Velazquez & J.J.Verm. (2015)
Bulbophyllum lobbii subsp. breviflorum (J.J.Sm.) Mangal, F.Velazquez & J.J.Verm. (2015)
Bulbophyllum lobbii subsp. lobbiiBulbophyllum lobbii subsp. siamense (Rchb.f.) Mangal, F.Velazquez & J.J.Verm. (2015)
Bulbophyllum loherianum (Kraenzl.) Ames in E.D.Merrill 1925
Bulbophyllum lohokii J.J.Verm. & A.L.Lamb 1994
Bulbophyllum lokonense Schltr. 1911
Bulbophyllum lombokense Rysy (2014)
Bulbophyllum lomsakense J.J.Verm., Schuit. & de Vogel (2014)
Bulbophyllum lonchophyllum Schltr. 1913
Bulbophyllum longebracteatum Seidenf. (1979)
Bulbophyllum longerepens Ridl. (1908)
Bulbophyllum longhutense J.J.Sm. 1931
Bulbophyllum longibrachiatum Z.H.Tsi 1981
Bulbophyllum longibracteatum Seidenf. 1979
Bulbophyllum longiflorum Thouars 1822 – pale umbrella orchid
Bulbophyllum longilabre Schltr. 1912
Bulbophyllum longimucronatum Ames & C.Schweinf. in O.Ames 1920
Bulbophyllum longipedicellatum J.J.Sm. 1910
Bulbophyllum longipedicellatum var. gjellerupii J.J.Sm. 1911
Bulbophyllum longipedicellatum var. longipedicellatum
Bulbophyllum longipes Rchb.f. in W.G.Walpers (1861)
Bulbophyllum longipetalum Pabst 1964
Bulbophyllum longipetiolatum Ames 1912
Bulbophyllum longirostre Schltr. 1913
Bulbophyllum longiscapum Rolfe 1896
Bulbophyllum longisepalum Rolfe 1895
Bulbophyllum longissimum (Ridl.) J.J.Sm. 1912
Bulbophyllum longistelidium Ridl. (1924)
Bulbophyllum longivagans Carr 1933
Bulbophyllum longivaginans H.Perrier 1937
Bulbophyllum lopalanthum J.J.Verm., Schuit. & de Vogel (2014)
Bulbophyllum lophoglottis (Guillaumin) N.Hall 1977
Bulbophyllum lophoton J.J.Verm. 1993
Bulbophyllum lordoglossum J.J.Verm. & A.L.Lamb 1994
Bulbophyllum lorentzianum J.J.Sm. 1910
Bulbophyllum louisiadum Schltr. 1919
Bulbophyllum loxophyllum Schltr. 1913
Bulbophyllum luanii Tixier 1965
Bulbophyllum lucidum Schltr. 1924
Bulbophyllum luciphilum Stvart 2000
Bulbophyllum luckraftii F.Muell. 1882
Bulbophyllum lumbriciforme J.J.Sm. 1920
Bulbophyllum lupulinum Lindl. 1862
Bulbophyllum luteobracteatum Jum. & H.Perrier 1912
Bulbophyllum luteopurpureum J.J.Sm. 1907
Bulbophyllum luteum J.J.Verm (2008)
Bulbophyllum lyciachungianum P.O'Byrne & Gokusing (2016)
Bulbophyllum lygeron J.J.Verm. 1991
Bulbophyllum lyperocephalum Schltr. 1924
Bulbophyllum lyperostachyum Schltr. 1924
Bulbophyllum lyriforme J.J.Verm. & P.O'Byrne 2003

M
Bulbophyllum maanshanense Z.J.Liu, L.J.Chen & W.H.Rao (2010)
Bulbophyllum maboroense Schltr. 1913
Bulbophyllum machupicchuense D.E.Benn. & Christenson 2001
Bulbophyllum macilentum J.J.Verm. 1993
Bulbophyllum macneiceae Schuit. & de Vogel (2005)
Bulbophyllum macphersonii Rupp 1934 – small eyelash orchid
Bulbophyllum macphersonii var. macphersonii
Bulbophyllum macphersonii var. spathulatum Dockrill & St.Cloud 1957
Bulbophyllum macraei (Lindl.) Rchb.f. in W.G.Walpers 1861
Bulbophyllum macranthoides Kraenzl. 1905: Macrantha-like Bulbophyllum
Bulbophyllum macranthum Lindl. 1844
Bulbophyllum macrobulbum J.J.Sm. 1910
Bulbophyllum macrocarpum Frapp. ex Cordem. 1895
Bulbophyllum macroceras Barb.Rodr. 1882
Bulbophyllum macrochilum Rolfe 1896
Bulbophyllum macrocoleum Seidenf. 1979
Bulbophyllum macrorhopalon Schltr. 1913
Bulbophyllum macrorrhinum (P.Royen) J.J.Verm. (2014)
Bulbophyllum macrourum Schltr. in K.M.Schumann & C.A.G.Lauterbach 1905
Bulbophyllum maculatum Boxall ex Náves in F.M.Blanco 1880
Bulbophyllum maculiflorum J.J.Verm., Schuit. & de Vogel (2015)
Bulbophyllum magnibracteatum Summerh. 1935
Bulbophyllum magnum J.J.Verm. (2013)
Bulbophyllum magnussonianum J.J.Verm., de Vogel & A.Vogel (2010)
Bulbophyllum mahakamense J.J.Sm. 1909
Bulbophyllum maijenense Schltr. 1913
Bulbophyllum majus (Ridl.) P.Royen 1979
Bulbophyllum makoyanum (Rchb.f.) Ridl. 1907
Bulbophyllum malachadenia Cogn. in C.F.P.von Martius 1902
Bulbophyllum maleolens Kraenzl. 1928
Bulbophyllum malleolabrum Carr 1932
Bulbophyllum mamberamense J.J.Sm. 1915
Bulbophyllum manabendrae D.K.Roy, Barbhuiya & Talukdar (2014)
Bulbophyllum mananjarense Poiss. 1912
Bulbophyllum manarae Foldats 1968
Bulbophyllum mandibulare Rchb.f. 1882: Chin-like Bulbophyllum
Bulbophyllum mangenotii Bosser 1965
Bulbophyllum manipurense C.S.Kumar & P.C.S.Kumar (2005)
Bulbophyllum manobulbum Schltr. in K.M.Schumann & C.A.G.Lauterbach 1905
Bulbophyllum maquilingense Ames & Quisumb. 1932: Mount Makiling Bulbophyllum
Bulbophyllum marginatum Schltr. 1913
Bulbophyllum marivelense Ames 1912
Bulbophyllum marknaivei Cootes, R.Boos & M.Leon (2016)
Bulbophyllum marojejiense H.Perrier 1951
Bulbophyllum marovoense H.Perrier 1951
Bulbophyllum marudiense Carr 1935
Bulbophyllum masaganapense Ames 1920
Bulbophyllum masarangicum Schltr. 1911
Bulbophyllum maskeliyense Livera 1926
Bulbophyllum masoalanum Schltr. 1916: Masoala Bulbophyllum
Bulbophyllum masonii (Senghas) J.J.Wood 1986
Bulbophyllum mastersianum (Rolfe) J.J.Sm. 1912
Bulbophyllum mattesii Sieder & Kiehn (2009)
Bulbophyllum maudeae A.D.Hawkes 1966
Bulbophyllum maxillare (Lindl.) Rchb.f. (1861) – red horntail orchid
Bulbophyllum maxillarioides Schltr. in K.M.Schumann & C.A.G.Lauterbach 1905
Bulbophyllum maximum (Lindl.) Rchb.f. in W.G.Walpers 1861
Bulbophyllum mayrii J.J.Sm. 1934
Bulbophyllum mearnsii Ames (1913 publ. 1914): Mearns' Bulbophyllum
Bulbophyllum mediocre Summerh. ex Exell 1959
Bulbophyllum medioximum J.J.Verm., Schuit. & de Vogel (2014)
Bulbophyllum medusae (Lindl.) Rchb.f. in W.G.Walpers 1861
Bulbophyllum megalonyx Rchb.f. 1881
Bulbophyllum melanoglossum Hayata 1914
Bulbophyllum melilotus J.J.Sm. 1929
Bulbophyllum melinanthum Schltr. in K.M.Schumann & C.A.G.Lauterbach 1905
Bulbophyllum melinoglossum Schltr. 1913
Bulbophyllum melleum H.Perrier 1937
Bulbophyllum melloi Pabst 1977
Bulbophyllum membranaceum Teijsm. & Binn. 1855
Bulbophyllum membranifolium Hook.f. 1890
Bulbophyllum membranifolium subsp. inunctum (J.J.Sm.) J.J.Verm., P.O'Byrne & A.L.Lamb (2015)
Bulbophyllum membranifolium subsp. membranifolium
Bulbophyllum menghaiense Z.H.Tsi 1981
Bulbophyllum menglaense Jian W.Li & X.H.Jin (2017)
Bulbophyllum menglunense Z.H.Tsi & Y.Z.Ma 1985
Bulbophyllum mengyuanense Q.Liu, Jian W.Li & X.H.Jin (2015)
Bulbophyllum mentiferum J.J.Sm. 1927
Bulbophyllum mentosum Barb.Rodr. 1877
Bulbophyllum meridense Rchb.f. 1850
Bulbophyllum meristorhachis Garay & Dunst. 1976
Bulbophyllum merrittii Ames 1907
Bulbophyllum mesodon J.J.Verm. 1993
Bulbophyllum meson J.J.Verm., Schuit. & de Vogel (2014)
Bulbophyllum metonymon Summerh. (1951 publ. 1952).
Bulbophyllum micholitzianum Kraenzl. 1893
Bulbophyllum micholitzii Rolfe 1901: Micholitz' Bulbophyllum
Bulbophyllum micranthum Barb.Rodr. 1877
Bulbophyllum microblepharon Schltr. 1913
Bulbophyllum microbulbon Schltr. in K.M.Schumann & C.A.G.Lauterbach 1905
Bulbophyllum microcala P.F.Hunt 1970
Bulbophyllum microdendron Schltr. 1913
Bulbophyllum microglossum Ridl. 1908: Small-lipped Bulbophyllum
Bulbophyllum microlabium W.Kittr. (1984 publ. 1985).
Bulbophyllum micronesiacum Schltr. 1921
Bulbophyllum micropetaliforme Leite 1946
Bulbophyllum micropetalum Lindl. (1862)
Bulbophyllum microrhombos Schltr. 1912
Bulbophyllum microsphaerum Schltr. 1913
Bulbophyllum microtepalum Rchb.f. in W.G.Walpers 1861: 
Bulbophyllum microtes Schltr. 1913
Bulbophyllum microthamnus Schltr. 1923
Bulbophyllum migueldavidii Cootes, Cabactulan & Pimentel (2017)
Bulbophyllum mimiense Schltr. 1913
Bulbophyllum minax Schltr. 1924
Bulbophyllum mindorense Ames 1907
Bulbophyllum minutibulbum W.Kittr. (1984 publ. 1985).
Bulbophyllum minutilabrum H.Perrier 1937
Bulbophyllum minutipetalum Schltr. 1913: Small-petaled Bulbophyllum
Bulbophyllum minutissimum (F.Muell.) F.Muell. 1878
Bulbophyllum minutius J.J.Verm., Schuit. & de Vogel (2014)
Bulbophyllum minutulum Ridl. ex Burkill & Holttum 1923
Bulbophyllum minutum Thouars 1822
Bulbophyllum mirabile Hallier f. 1889
Bulbophyllum mirificum Schltr. 1918
Bulbophyllum mirum J.J.Sm. 1906
Bulbophyllum mischobulbon Schltr. 1913
Bulbophyllum mobilifilum Carr 1929
Bulbophyllum moldenkeanum A.D.Hawkes 1966
Bulbophyllum molle J.J.Verm. & P.O'Byrne (2008)
Bulbophyllum molossus Rchb.f. 1888
Bulbophyllum mona-lisae Sieder & Kiehn (2009)
Bulbophyllum monanthos Ridl. 1897
Bulbophyllum moniliforme C.S.P.Parish & Rchb.f. 1874: Necklace Bulbophyllum
Bulbophyllum monosema Schltr. 1913
Bulbophyllum monstrabile Ames 1915
Bulbophyllum montanum Schltr. 1913
Bulbophyllum montense Ridl. ex Stapf 1894
Bulbophyllum montisdischorense J.J.Verm., Schuit. & de Vogel (2014)
Bulbophyllum moramanganum Schltr. 1922
Bulbophyllum moratii Bosser 1989
Bulbophyllum morenoi Dodson & R.Vásquez 1989
Bulbophyllum moroides J.J.Sm. 1917
Bulbophyllum morotaiense J.J.Sm. 1932
Bulbophyllum morphologorum Kraenzl. 1908
Bulbophyllum mucronatum (Blume) Lindl. 1830
Bulbophyllum mucronatum subsp. alagense (Ames) J.J.Verm. & P.O'Byrne (2011)
Bulbophyllum mucronatum subsp. mucronatum
Bulbophyllum mucronifolium Rchb.f. & Warm. in H.G.Reichenbach 1881
Bulbophyllum mulderae J.J.Verm. 1993
Bulbophyllum multiflexum J.J.Sm. 1927
Bulbophyllum multiflorum Ridl. 1885
Bulbophyllum multiligulatum H.Perrier 1937
Bulbophyllum multivaginatum Jum. & H.Perrier 1912
Bulbophyllum muluense J.J.Wood (1984)
Bulbophyllum muricatum J.J.Sm. 1911
Bulbophyllum muriceum Schltr. 1913
Bulbophyllum murkelense J.J.Sm. 1928
Bulbophyllum muscarirubrum Seidenf. 1979
Bulbophyllum muscicola Rchb.f. 1872
Bulbophyllum muscohaerens J.J.Verm. & A.L.Lamb 1994
Bulbophyllum mutabile (Blume) Lindl. 1830
Bulbophyllum myodes J.J.Verm. (2008)
Bulbophyllum myolaense Garay, Hamer & Siegerist 1995
Bulbophyllum myon J.J.Verm. 1990
Bulbophyllum myrmecochilum Schltr. 1924
Bulbophyllum myrtillus Schltr. 1913
Bulbophyllum mysorense (Rolfe) J.J.Sm. 1912
Bulbophyllum mystax Schuit. & de Vogel 2002
Bulbophyllum mystrochilum Schltr. 1913
Bulbophyllum mystrophyllum Schltr. 1919

N
Bulbophyllum nabawanense J.J.Wood & A.L.Lamb 1994
Bulbophyllum nagelii L.O.Williams 1939
Bulbophyllum namoronae Bosser 1971
Bulbophyllum nannodes Schltr. in K.M.Schumann & C.A.G.Lauterbach 1905
Bulbophyllum napellii Lindl. 1842
Bulbophyllum nasica Schltr. 1913
Bulbophyllum nasilabium Schltr. 1921
Bulbophyllum nasseri Garay 1999
Bulbophyllum nasutum Rchb.f. (1871)
Bulbophyllum navicula Schltr. 1913
Bulbophyllum naviculiforme P.O'Byrne & P.T.Ong (2014)
Bulbophyllum nebularum Schltr. 1913
Bulbophyllum neglectum Bosser 1965
Bulbophyllum negrosianum Ames 1912
Bulbophyllum nematocaulon Ridl. 1920
Bulbophyllum nematopodum F.Muell. 1872 – green cowl orchid
Bulbophyllum nematorhizis Schltr. 1913
Bulbophyllum nemorale L.O.Williams 1938
Bulbophyllum neoebudicum (Garay, Hamer & Siegerist) Sieder & Kiehn (2009)
Bulbophyllum neoguineense J.J.Sm. 1908
Bulbophyllum neopommeranicum Schltr. in K.M.Schumann & C.A.G.Lauterbach 1905
Bulbophyllum neotorricellense J.M.H.Shaw (2014)
Bulbophyllum nepalense Raskoti & Ale (2013)
Bulbophyllum nervulosum Frapp. ex Cordem. 1895
Bulbophyllum nesiotes Seidenf. 1979
Bulbophyllum newportii (F.M.Bailey) Rolfe 1909 – cupped strand orchid
Bulbophyllum ngoclinhensis Aver. 1997
Bulbophyllum ngoyense Schltr. 1906
Bulbophyllum nigericum Summerh. 1962
Bulbophyllum nigrescens Rolfe 1910
Bulbophyllum nigricans (Aver.) J.J.Verm., Schuit. & de Vogel (2014)
Bulbophyllum nigriflorum H.Perrier 1937
Bulbophyllum nigrilabium Schltr. 1913
Bulbophyllum nigripetalum Rolfe 1891
Bulbophyllum nigritianum Rendle 1913
Bulbophyllum nipondhii Seidenf. 1985
Bulbophyllum nitens Jum. & H.Perrier 1912
Bulbophyllum nitidum Schltr. 1912: Shimmering Bulbophyllum
Bulbophyllum nocturnum J. J. Verm., de Vogel, Schuit. & A. Vogel 2011
Bulbophyllum nodosum (Rolfe) J.J.Sm. 1912
Bulbophyllum notabilipetalum Seidenf. 1995
Bulbophyllum novaciae J.J.Verm. & P.O'Byrne (2003)
Bulbophyllum novae-hiberniae Schltr. in K.M.Schumann & C.A.G.Lauterbach 1905
Bulbophyllum novemfilum P.O'Byrne & P.T.Ong (2014)
Bulbophyllum nubigenum Schltr. 1913
Bulbophyllum nubinatum J.J.Verm. 1988
Bulbophyllum nujiangense X.H.Jin & W.T.Jin (2014)
Bulbophyllum nummularia (H.Wendl. & Kraenzl.) Rolfe in D.Oliver 1897
Bulbophyllum nummularioides Schltr. 1913
Bulbophyllum nutans (Thouars) Thouars 1822
Bulbophyllum nutans var. nutans
Bulbophyllum nutans var. variifolium (Schltr.) Bosser 1965
Bulbophyllum nymphopolitanum Kraenzl. (1916)

O
Bulbophyllum oblanceolatum King & Pantl. 1897
Bulbophyllum obliquum Schltr. 1911
Bulbophyllum oblongum (Lindl.) Rchb.f. in W.G.Walpers (1861)
Bulbophyllum obovatifolium J.J.Sm. 1912
Bulbophyllum obovatum (J.J.Sm.) J.J.Verm., Schuit. & de Vogel (2014)
Bulbophyllum obrienianum Rolfe (1892)
Bulbophyllum obscuriflorum H.Perrier 1937
Bulbophyllum obtusatum Schltr. 1924
Bulbophyllum obtusipetalum J.J.Sm. 1905
Bulbophyllum obtusum (Blume) Lindl. 1830
Bulbophyllum obyrnei Garay, Hamer & Siegerist 1995
Bulbophyllum occlusum Ridl. 1885
Bulbophyllum occultum Thouars 1822
Bulbophyllum ocellatum Cootes & M.A.Clem.8 (2011)
Bulbophyllum ochroleucum Schltr. in K.M.Schumann & C.A.G.Lauterbach 1905
Bulbophyllum ochroxanthum J.J.Verm. & A.L.Lamb (2013)
Bulbophyllum ochthochilum J.J.Verm. 1993
Bulbophyllum ochthodes J.J.Verm. 2002
Bulbophyllum octarrhenipetalum J.J.Sm. 1913
Bulbophyllum octorhopalon Seidenf. 1975
Bulbophyllum odoardii Rchb.f. & Pfitzer 1884
Bulbophyllum odontoglossum Schltr. 1913
Bulbophyllum odontopelatum Schltr. 1913
Bulbophyllum odontostigma J.J.Verm. (2008)
Bulbophyllum odoratissimum (Sm.) Lindl. ex Hook.f. 1890: Fragrant Bulbophyllum
Bulbophyllum odoratissimum var. odoratissimum
Bulbophyllum odoratissimum var. racemosum N.P.Balakr. 1978
Bulbophyllum odoratum (Blume) Lindl. 1830
Bulbophyllum oeneum Burkill ex Ridl. (1924)
Bulbophyllum oerstedii (Rchb.f.) Hemsl. (1884)
Bulbophyllum oliganthum Schltr. 1913
Bulbophyllum oligochaete Schltr. 1913
Bulbophyllum oligoglossum Rchb.f. 1865
Bulbophyllum olivinum J.J.Sm. 1934
Bulbophyllum olivinum subsp. linguiferum J.J.Verm. 1993
Bulbophyllum olivinum subsp. olivinum
Bulbophyllum olorinum J.J.Sm. 1912
Bulbophyllum omerandrum Hayata 1914
Bulbophyllum oncopus J.J.Verm. & P.O'Byrne (2008)
Bulbophyllum onivense H.Perrier 1937
Bulbophyllum oobulbum Schltr. 1913
Bulbophyllum ophiuchus Ridl. 1886
Bulbophyllum ophiuchus var. baronianum H.Perrier ex Hermans (2007)
Bulbophyllum ophiuchus var. ophiuchus
Bulbophyllum orbiculare J.J.Sm. 1912
Bulbophyllum orbiculare subsp. cassideum (J.J.Sm.) J.J.Verm. 1993
Bulbophyllum orbiculare subsp. orbiculare
Bulbophyllum orectopetalum Garay, Hamer & Siegerist 1992
Bulbophyllum oreocharis Schltr. 1913
Bulbophyllum oreodorum Schltr. 1924
Bulbophyllum oreodoxa Schltr. 1913
Bulbophyllum oreogenum Schltr. 1913
Bulbophyllum oreogigas J.J.Verm., P.O'Byrne & A.L.Lamb (2015)
Bulbophyllum oreomene J.J.Verm., Schuit. & de Vogel (2014)
Bulbophyllum oreonastes Rchb.f. 1881
Bulbophyllum orezii Sath.Kumar 2004
Bulbophyllum orientale Seidenf. 1979: Eastern Bulbophyllum
Bulbophyllum origami J.J.Verm. 1993
Bulbophyllum ornatissimum (Rchb.f.) J.J.Sm. 1912
Bulbophyllum ornatum Schltr. 1913
Bulbophyllum orohense J.J.Sm. 1915
Bulbophyllum orsidice Ridl. 1916
Bulbophyllum ortalis J.J.Verm. 1993
Bulbophyllum orthosepalum J.J.Verm. 1993: Straight-petaled Bulbophyllum
Bulbophyllum osyricera Schltr. 1911
Bulbophyllum osyriceroides J.J.Sm. 1920
Bulbophyllum othonis (Kuntze) J.J.Sm. 1912
Bulbophyllum otochilum J.J.Verm. 1991
Bulbophyllum ovalifolium (Blume) Lindl. 1830: Oval-leafed Bulbophyllum
Bulbophyllum ovatolanceatum J.J.Sm. 1928
Bulbophyllum ovatum Seidenf. 1979
Bulbophyllum oxyanthum Schltr. in K.M.Schumann & C.A.G.Lauterbach 1905
Bulbophyllum oxycalyx Schltr. 1924
Bulbophyllum oxycalyx var. oxycalyx
Bulbophyllum oxycalyx var. rubescens (Schltr.) Bosser 1965
Bulbophyllum oxychilum Schltr. 1905

P
Bulbophyllum pachyacris J.J.Sm. 1908
Bulbophyllum pachyanthum Schltr. 1906
Bulbophyllum pachyglossum Schltr. 1919
Bulbophyllum pachyneuron Schltr. 1911
Bulbophyllum pachypus Schltr. 1924
Bulbophyllum pachytelos Schltr. in K.M.Schumann & C.A.G.Lauterbach 1905
Bulbophyllum pahudii (de Vriese) Rchb.f. in W.G.Walpers 1861
Bulbophyllum paleiferum Schltr. 1924
Bulbophyllum pallens (Jum. & Perrier) Schltr. 1924
Bulbophyllum pallidulum J.J.Verm., Schuit. & de Vogel (2014)
Bulbophyllum pallidum Seidenf. 1979
Bulbophyllum pampangense Ames 1923
Bulbophyllum pan Ridl. 1915
Bulbophyllum pandanetorum Summerh. (1953 publ. 1954).
Bulbophyllum pandurella Schltr. 1924
Bulbophyllum pantoblepharon Schltr. 1924
Bulbophyllum pantoblepharon var. pantoblepharon
Bulbophyllum pantoblepharon var. vestitum H.Perrier ex Hermans (2007)
Bulbophyllum papangense H.Perrier 1937
Bulbophyllum papilio J.J.Sm. 1910
Bulbophyllum papillatum J.J.Sm. 1910
Bulbophyllum papillipetalum Ames 1922
Bulbophyllum papillosofilum Carr 1929
Bulbophyllum papuanum (Schltr.) J.J.Verm., Schuit. & de Vogel (2014)
Bulbophyllum papuliferum Schltr. 1911
Bulbophyllum papuliglossum Schltr. 1913
Bulbophyllum papulipetalum Schltr. 1913
Bulbophyllum papulosum Garay 1999: Warty Bulbophyllum
Bulbophyllum parabates J.J.Verm. 1991
Bulbophyllum paraemarginatum Aver. (2007)
Bulbophyllum paranaense Schltr. 1919
Bulbophyllum paranaense var. paranaense
Bulbophyllum pardalinum Ridl. 1916
Bulbophyllum pardalotum Garay 1995
Bulbophyllum parviflorum C.S.P.Parish & Rchb.f. 1874
Bulbophyllum parvum Summerh. 1957
Bulbophyllum patella J.J.Verm. 1993
Bulbophyllum patens King ex Hook.f. 1896
Bulbophyllum pauciflorum Ames 1912
Bulbophyllum paucisetum J.J.Sm. 1915
Bulbophyllum paulianum J.J.Verm., Schuit. & de Vogel (2014)
Bulbophyllum paululum Schltr. 1913
Bulbophyllum pauwelsianum Stévart & Droissart (2014)
Bulbophyllum pauzii P.O'Byrne & P.T.Ong (2014)
Bulbophyllum pecten-veneris (Gagnep.) Seidenf. (1973 publ. 1974):
Bulbophyllum pectinatum Finet 1897
Bulbophyllum pedilochilus J.J.Verm., Schuit. & de Vogel (2014)
Bulbophyllum pelicanopsis J.J.Verm. & A.L.Lamb 1988
Bulbophyllum peltopus Schltr. 1913
Bulbophyllum pemae Schltr. 1913
Bulbophyllum pendens J.J.Verm. (2008)
Bulbophyllum penduliscapum J.J.Sm. 1900
Bulbophyllum pendulum Thouars 1822
Bulbophyllum penicillium C.S.P.Parish & Rchb.f. 1874: Brush-lipped Bulbophyllum
Bulbophyllum peninsulare Seidenf. 1979: Peninsula Bulbophyllum
Bulbophyllum pentaneurum Seidenf. 1979
Bulbophyllum pentastichum (Pfitzer ex Kraenzl.) H.Perrier 1939
Bulbophyllum pentastichum subsp. pentastichum
Bulbophyllum pentastichum subsp. rostratum H.Perrier ex Hermans (2007)
Bulbophyllum peperomiifolium J.J.Sm. 1918
Bulbophyllum peramoenum Ames, Philipp. (1913 publ. 1914).
Bulbophyllum percorniculatum H.Perrier 1951
Bulbophyllum perexiguum Ridl. 1916
Bulbophyllum perforans J.J.Sm. 1935
Bulbophyllum perii Schltr. 1922
Bulbophyllum perparvulum Schltr. 1915
Bulbophyllum perpendiculare Schltr. 1911
Bulbophyllum perpusillum H.Wendl. & Kraenzl. 1894
Bulbophyllum perreflexum Bosser & P.J.Cribb 2001
Bulbophyllum perrieri Schltr. 1913
Bulbophyllum perryi J.J.Verm. & Kindler (2015)
Bulbophyllum perseverans Hermans (2007)
Bulbophyllum pervillei Rolfe ex Scott-Elliot 1891
Bulbophyllum petiolare Thwaites 1861
Bulbophyllum petiolatum J.J.Sm. 1910
Bulbophyllum petioliferum J.J.Verm., Schuit. & de Vogel (2014)
Bulbophyllum petrae G.A.Fisch., Sieder & P.J.Cribb (2007)
Bulbophyllum petrophilum (P.Royen) J.J.Verm., Schuit. & de Vogel (2014)
Bulbophyllum peyrotii Bosser 1965
Bulbophyllum phaeanthum Schltr. 1911
Bulbophyllum phaeoglossum Schltr. 1913
Bulbophyllum phaeoneuron Schltr. 1911
Bulbophyllum phaeorhabdos Schltr. 1923
Bulbophyllum phalaenopsis J.J.Sm. 1937
Bulbophyllum phayamense Seidenf. 1979
Bulbophyllum phillipsianum Kores 1991
Bulbophyllum phitamii Aver. (2017)
Bulbophyllum phormion J.J.Verm. 1992
Bulbophyllum phreatiopse J.J.Verm. 1993
Bulbophyllum phymatum J.J.Verm. 1982
Bulbophyllum physocoryphum Seidenf. 1979
Bulbophyllum physometrum J.J.Verm., Suksathan & Watthana (2017)
Bulbophyllum pictum C.S.P.Parish & Rchb.f. (1874)
Bulbophyllum picturatum (Lodd.) Rchb.f. in W.G.Walpers 1861
Bulbophyllum pidacanthum J.J.Verm. 1992
Bulbophyllum piestobulbon Schltr. 1923
Bulbophyllum piestoglossum J.J.Verm. 1993: Narrow-labellum Bulbophyllum
Bulbophyllum pileatum Lindl. 1844: Fibery Bulbophyllum
Bulbophyllum piliferum J.J.Sm. 1908
Bulbophyllum pilosum J.J.Verm. 2002
Bulbophyllum piluliferum King & Pantl. 1895
Bulbophyllum pinelianum (A.Rich.) Ormerod (2016)
Bulbophyllum pingnanense J.F.Liu, S.R.Lan & Y.C.Liang (2016)
Bulbophyllum pingtungense S.S.Ying & S.C.Chen in S.S.Ying (1985)
Bulbophyllum pinicolum Gagnep. 1930
Bulbophyllum pipio Rchb.f. 1876
Bulbophyllum pisibulbum J.J.Sm. 1914
Bulbophyllum pitengoense Campacci (2010)
Bulbophyllum piundaundense (P.Royen) J.J.Verm., Schuit. & de Vogel (2014)
Bulbophyllum placochilum J.J.Verm. 1991
Bulbophyllum plagiatum Ridl. 1916
Bulbophyllum plagiopetalum Schltr. 1913
Bulbophyllum planibulbe (Ridl.) Ridl. 1907
Bulbophyllum planiplexum J.J.Verm. (2008)
Bulbophyllum planitiae J.J.Sm. 1910
Bulbophyllum platypodum H.Perrier 1937
Bulbophyllum pleiopterum Schltr. 1912
Bulbophyllum pleochromum J.J.Verm. & A.L.Lamb (2013)
Bulbophyllum pleurocrepis J.J.Verm., Cootes & M.Perry (2017)
Bulbophyllum pleurothallidanthum Garay 1999
Bulbophyllum pleurothalloides Ames 1907
Bulbophyllum pleurothallopsis Schltr. 1924
Bulbophyllum plicatum J.J.Verm. 1993
Bulbophyllum plumatum Ames 1915
Bulbophyllum plumosum (Barb.Rodr.) Cogn. in C.F.P.von Martius 1902
Bulbophyllum plumula Schltr. 1913
Bulbophyllum pocillum J.J.Verm. 1991
Bulbophyllum poekilon Carr 1932
Bulbophyllum polliculosum Seidenf. 1973
Bulbophyllum polyblepharon Schltr. in K.M.Schumann & C.A.G.Lauterbach 1905
Bulbophyllum polycyclum J.J.Verm. 1996
Bulbophyllum polyflorum J.M.H.Shaw (2016)
Bulbophyllum polygaliflorum J.J.Wood 1984
Bulbophyllum polyphyllum Schltr. 1913
Bulbophyllum polyrrhizum Lindl. 1830
Bulbophyllum polythyris J.J.Verm. & Sieder (2015)
Bulbophyllum popayanense Kraenzl. 1899
Bulbophyllum porphyrostachys Summerh. 1951
Bulbophyllum porphyrotriche J.J.Verm. 1991
Bulbophyllum posticum J.J.Sm. 1911
Bulbophyllum potamophilum Schltr. 1913
Bulbophyllum praetervisum J.J.Verm. 2002
Bulbophyllum prianganense J.J.Sm. 1913
Bulbophyllum prismaticum Thouars 1822
Bulbophyllum pristis J.J.Sm. 1913
Bulbophyllum proboscideum (Gagnep.) Seidenf. & Smitinand 1961
Bulbophyllum proculcastris J.J.Verm. 2000
Bulbophyllum propinquum Kraenzl. 1908
Bulbophyllum prorepens Summerh. (1953 publ. 1954).
Bulbophyllum protectum H.Perrier 1937
Bulbophyllum protractum Hook.f. 1890
Bulbophyllum proudlockii (King & Pantl.) J.J.Sm. 1912
Bulbophyllum pseudoconiferum W.Suarez & Cootes (2009)
Bulbophyllum pseudofilicaule J.J.Sm. 1935
Bulbophyllum pseudohydra (Summerh.) J.M.H.Shaw (2016)
Bulbophyllum pseudopelma J.J.Verm. & P.O'Byrne 2003
Bulbophyllum pseudopicturatum (Garay) Sieder & Kiehn (2009)
Bulbophyllum pseudoserrulatum J.J.Sm. 1912
Bulbophyllum pseudotrias J.J.Verm. 1996
Bulbophyllum psilorhopalon Schltr. 1913
Bulbophyllum psittacoglossum Rchb.f. 1863
Bulbophyllum psychrophilum (F.Muell.) J.J.Verm., Schuit. & de Vogel (2014)
Bulbophyllum pteroglossum Schltr. (1919)
Bulbophyllum pterostele J.J.Verm., P.O'Byrne & A.L.Lamb (2015)
Bulbophyllum ptiloglossum H.Wendl. & Kraenzl. 1897
Bulbophyllum ptilotes Schltr. 1913
Bulbophyllum ptychantyx J.J.Verm. 1993
Bulbophyllum ptychostigma J.J.Verm. (2008)
Bulbophyllum pubiflorum Schltr. 1911
Bulbophyllum pugilanthum J.J.Wood 1994
Bulbophyllum puguahaanense Ames 1915
Bulbophyllum puluongensis (Aver. & Averyanova) Sieder & Kiehn (2010 publ. 2011)
Bulbophyllum pulvinatum Schltr. 1913
Bulbophyllum pumilio C.S.P.Parish & Rchb.f. 1874
Bulbophyllum pumilum (Sw.) Lindl. (1830)
Bulbophyllum punamense Schltr. 1913
Bulbophyllum punctatum Barb.Rodr. 1877
Bulbophyllum pungens Schltr. 1913
Bulbophyllum puntjakense J.J.Sm. 1907
Bulbophyllum purpurascens Teijsm. & Binn. 1862
Bulbophyllum purpurellum Ridl. 1916
Bulbophyllum purpureofuscum J.J.Verm., Schuit. & de Vogel (2014)
Bulbophyllum purpureorhachis (De Wild.) Schltr. 1914
Bulbophyllum purpureum Thwaites 1861
Bulbophyllum pusillum Thouars 1822
Bulbophyllum pustulatum Ridl. 1898
Bulbophyllum putaoensis Q.Liu (2017)
Bulbophyllum putidum (Teijsm. & Binn.) J.J.Sm. 1912
Bulbophyllum putii Seidenf. 1979
Bulbophyllum pygmaeum (Sm.) Lindl. 1830
Bulbophyllum pyridion J.J.Verm. 1991
Bulbophyllum pyroglossum Schuit. & de Vogel (2005)

Q
Bulbophyllum quadrangulare J.J.Sm. 1911
Bulbophyllum quadrialatum H.Perrier 1939
Bulbophyllum quadricarinum Kores 1989
Bulbophyllum quadricaudatum J.J.Sm. 1911
Bulbophyllum quadrichaete Schltr. 1913
Bulbophyllum quadrifalciculatum J.J.Sm. 1929
Bulbophyllum quadrifarium Rolfe 1903
Bulbophyllum quadrisetum Lindl. 1843
Bulbophyllum quadrisubulatum J.J.Sm. 1929
Bulbophyllum quasimodo J.J.Verm. 1991
Bulbophyllum quinquelobum Schltr. 1913

R
Bulbophyllum radicans F.M.Bailey 1897 – striped pyjama orchid
Bulbophyllum ramulicola Schuit. & de Vogel 2002
Bulbophyllum ranomafanae Bosser & P.J.Cribb 2001
Bulbophyllum rariflorum J.J.Sm. 1908
Bulbophyllum rarum Schltr. 1913
Bulbophyllum raskotii J.J.Verm., Schuit. & de Vogel (2014)
Bulbophyllum rauhii Toill.-Gen. & Bosser 1961
Bulbophyllum rauhii var. andranobeense Bosser 1971
Bulbophyllum rauhii var. rauhii
Bulbophyllum raui Arora (1969 publ. 1972)
Bulbophyllum ravanii Cootes (2011)
Bulbophyllum reclusum Seidenf. 1995
Bulbophyllum rectilabre J.J.Sm. 1912
Bulbophyllum recurviflorum J.J.Sm. 1903
Bulbophyllum recurvilabre Garay 1999
Bulbophyllum reductum J.J.Verm. & P.O'Byrne 2003
Bulbophyllum reevei J.J.Verm. 1992
Bulbophyllum reflexiflorum H.Perrier 1937
Bulbophyllum reflexiflorum subsp. pogonochilum (Summerh.) Bosser 2000
Bulbophyllum reflexiflorum subsp. reflexiflorum
Bulbophyllum refractilingue J.J.Sm. 1931
Bulbophyllum refractum (Zoll.) Rchb.f. in W.G.Walpers 1861
Bulbophyllum reginaldoi Campacci (2009)
Bulbophyllum regnellii Rchb.f. 1850
Bulbophyllum reichenbachianum Kraenzl. 1893
Bulbophyllum reichenbachii (Kuntze) Schltr. 1915
Bulbophyllum reifii Sieder & Kieh (2009)
Bulbophyllum remiferum Carr 1933
Bulbophyllum remotifolium (Fukuy.) K.Nakaj. (1973)
Bulbophyllum renipetalum Schltr. 1913
Bulbophyllum renkinianum (Laurent) De Wild. 1921
Bulbophyllum repens Griff. 1851
Bulbophyllum reptans (Lindl.) Lindl. in N.Wallich 1829
Bulbophyllum restrepia (Ridl.) Ridl. 1893
Bulbophyllum resupinatum Ridl. 1887
Bulbophyllum resupinatum var. filiforme (Kraenzl.) J.J.Verm. 1986
Bulbophyllum resupinatum var. resupinatum
Bulbophyllum reticulatum Bateman ex Hook.f. 1866
Bulbophyllum retrorsum J.J.Verm. & A.L.Lamb (2008)
Bulbophyllum retusiusculum Rchb.f. 1869
Bulbophyllum rheedei Manilal & Sath.Kumar 1991
Bulbophyllum rheophyton J.J.Verm. & Tsukaya (2011)
Bulbophyllum rhizomatosum Ames & C.Schweinf. in O.Ames 1920
Bulbophyllum rhodoglossum Schltr. 1913
Bulbophyllum rhodoleucum Schltr. 1913
Bulbophyllum rhodoneuron Schltr. 1913
Bulbophyllum rhodophyllum J.J.Verm. & P.O'Byrne (2008)
Bulbophyllum rhodosepalum Schltr. 1901
Bulbophyllum rhodostachys Schltr. 1916
Bulbophyllum rhomboglossum Schltr. 1913
Bulbophyllum rhopaloblepharon Schltr. 1913
Bulbophyllum rhopalophorum Schltr. 1913
Bulbophyllum rhynchoglossum Schltr. 1910
Bulbophyllum rictorium Schltr. (1925)
Bulbophyllum rienanense H.Perrier 1937
Bulbophyllum rigidifilum J.J.Sm. 1920
Bulbophyllum rigidipes Schltr. in K.M.Schumann & C.A.G.Lauterbach 1905
Bulbophyllum rigidum King & Pantl. 1895
Bulbophyllum rimannii (Rchb.f.) J.J.Verm., Schuit. & de Vogel (2014)
Bulbophyllum riparium J.J.Sm. 1929
Bulbophyllum rivulare Schltr. 1913
Bulbophyllum rolfei (Kuntze) Seidenf. 1979
Bulbophyllum romburghii J.J.Sm. 1907
Bulbophyllum romyi B.Thoms (2015)
Bulbophyllum roraimense Rolfe 1896
Bulbophyllum rosemarianum Sath.Kumar 2001
Bulbophyllum roseopictum J.J.Verm., Schuit. & de Vogel (2014)
Bulbophyllum roseopunctatum Schltr. 1913
Bulbophyllum roseum Ridl. (1896)
Bulbophyllum rostriceps Rchb.f. 1878
Bulbophyllum rothschildianum (O'Brien) J.J.Sm. 1912: Rothschild's Bulbophyylum
Bulbophyllum roxburghii (Lindl.) Rchb.f. in W.G.Walpers 1861
Bulbophyllum rubiferum J.J.Sm. 1918
Bulbophyllum rubiginosum Schltr. 1925
Bulbophyllum rubipetalum P.Royen 1979
Bulbophyllum rubrigemmum Hermans (2007)
Bulbophyllum rubroguttatum Seidenf. 1985
Bulbophyllum rubrolabellum T.P.Lin 1975
Bulbophyllum rubrolabium Schltr. 1916
Bulbophyllum rubrolineatum Schltr. 1923
Bulbophyllum rubrolingue Cootes & Boos (2015)
Bulbophyllum rubromaculatum W.Kittr. (1984 publ. 1985).
Bulbophyllum rubrum Jum. & H.Perrier 1912
Bulbophyllum rubusioides Naive, M.Leon & Cootes (2017)
Bulbophyllum ruficaudatum Ridl. 1910
Bulbophyllum rufilabrum C.S.P.Parish ex Hook.f. 1890
Bulbophyllum rufinum Rchb.f. 1881
Bulbophyllum ruginosum H.Perrier (1937)
Bulbophyllum rugosibulbum Summerh. 1960
Bulbophyllum rugosisepalum Seidenf. 1979
Bulbophyllum rugosum Ridl. 1897
Bulbophyllum rugulosum J.J.Sm. 1935
Bulbophyllum rupicola Barb.Rodr. 1877
Bulbophyllum rutenbergianum Schltr. 1924
Bulbophyllum rutilans J.J.Verm. & A.L.Lamb, (2008)
Bulbophyllum rutiliflorum J.J.Verm., Schuit. & de Vogel (2014)
Bulbophyllum rysyanum Roeth (2007)

S
Bulbophyllum saccoglossum J.J.Verm., Schuit. & de Vogel (2014)
Bulbophyllum saccolabioides J.J.Sm. 1929
Bulbophyllum sagemuelleri R.Bustam. & Kindler (2015)
Bulbophyllum salaccense Rchb.f. 1857
Bulbophyllum salmoneum Aver. & J.J.Verm. (2012)
Bulbophyllum saltatorium Lindl. 1837: Dancing Bulbophyllum
Bulbophyllum saltatorium var. albociliatum (Finet) J.J.Verm. 1986
Bulbophyllum saltatorium var. calamarium (Lindl.) J.J.Verm. 1986
Bulbophyllum saltatorium var. saltatorium
Bulbophyllum salmoneum Aver. & J.J.Verm. (2012)
Bulbophyllum sambiranense Jum. & H.Perrier 1912
Bulbophyllum samoanum Schltr. 1911: Samoan Bulbophyllum
Bulbophyllum sanderianum Rolfe 1893
Bulbophyllum sandersonii (Hook.f.) Rchb.f. 1878
Bulbophyllum sandersonii subsp. sandersonii
Bulbophyllum sandersonii subsp. stenopetalum (Kraenzl.) J.J.Verm. 1986
Bulbophyllum sandrangatense Bosser 1965
Bulbophyllum sangae Schltr. 1905
Bulbophyllum sanguineomaculatum Ridl. (1896)
Bulbophyllum sanguineopunctatum Seidenf. & A.D.Kerr (1973 publ. 1974)
Bulbophyllum sanguineum H.Perrier 1937
Bulbophyllum sanitii Seidenf. 1970
Bulbophyllum sannio J.J.Verm. (2008)
Bulbophyllum santoense J.J.Verm. 1993
Bulbophyllum santosii Ames 1915: Santos' Bulbophyllum
Bulbophyllum sapphirinum Ames 1915
Bulbophyllum sarasinorum Schltr. 1925
Bulbophyllum sarawaketense (P.Royen) J.J.Verm., Schuit. & de Vogel (2014)
Bulbophyllum sarcanthiforme Ridl. 1916
Bulbophyllum sarcochilum J.J.Verm. & P.O'Byrne (2008)
Bulbophyllum sarcodanthum Schltr. 1913
Bulbophyllum sarcophylloides Garay, Hamer & Siegerist 1994: Sarcophyllum-like Bulbophyllum
Bulbophyllum sarcophyllum (King & Pantl.) J.J.Sm. 1912: Fleshy Red-leafed Bulbophyllum
Bulbophyllum sarcorhachis Schltr. 1918
Bulbophyllum sarcorhachis var. befaonense (Schltr.) H.Perrier 1937
Bulbophyllum sarcorhachis var. flavomarginatum H.Perrier ex Hermans (2007)
Bulbophyllum sarcorhachis var. sarcorhachis
Bulbophyllum sarcoscapum Teijsm. & Binn. 1867
Bulbophyllum saronae Garay 1999
Bulbophyllum sasakii (Hayata) J.J.Verm., Schuit. & de Vogel (2014)
Bulbophyllum sauguetiense Schltr. 1913
Bulbophyllum saurocephalum Rchb.f. 1886
Bulbophyllum saurocephalum subsp. oncoglossum W.Suarez (2011)
Bulbophyllum saurocephalum subsp. saurocephalum
Bulbophyllum savaiense Schltr. 1911
Bulbophyllum savaiense subsp. gorumense (Schltr.) J.J.Verm. 1993
Bulbophyllum savaiense subsp. savaiense
Bulbophyllum savaiense subsp. subcubicum (J.J.Sm.) J.J.Verm. 1993
Bulbophyllum sawiense J.J.Sm. 1912
Bulbophyllum scaberulum (Rolfe) Bolus 1889: Slightly-roughened Bulbophyllum
Bulbophyllum scaberulum var. crotalicaudatum J.J.Verm. 1987
Bulbophyllum scaberulum var. fuerstenbergianum (De Wild.) J.J.Verm. 1986
Bulbophyllum scaberulum var. scaberulum
Bulbophyllum scabratum Rchb.f. in W.G.Walpers 1861
Bulbophyllum scabrum J.J.Verm. & A.L.Lamb 1988
Bulbophyllum scaphiforme J.J.Verm. 2002
Bulbophyllum scaphioglossum J.J.Verm. & Rysy, (2014)
Bulbophyllum scaphosepalum Ridl. 1916
Bulbophyllum scariosum Summerh. 1953
Bulbophyllum sceliphron J.J.Verm. 1991
Bulbophyllum schaiblei Cootes & Naive (2017)
Bulbophyllum schefferi (Kuntze) Schltr. 1915
Bulbophyllum schillerianum Rchb.f. 1860: Schiller's Bulbophyllum
Bulbophyllum schimperianum Kraenzl. 1902
Bulbophyllum schinzianum Kraenzl. 1899
Bulbophyllum schinzianum var. irigaleae (P.J.Cribb & Pérez-Vera) J.J.Verm. 1987
Bulbophyllum schinzianum var. phaeopogon (Schltr.) J.J.Verm. 1986
Bulbophyllum schinzianum var. schinzianum
Bulbophyllum schistopetalum Schltr. in K.M.Schumann & C.A.G.Lauterbach 1905
Bulbophyllum schizopetalum L.O.Williams 1946
Bulbophyllum schmidii Garay 1999: Schmid's Bulbophyllum
Bulbophyllum schmidtianum Rchb.f. 1865
Bulbophyllum schuitemanii J.J.Verm. (2008)
Bulbophyllum schwarzii Sieder & Kiehn (2010 publ. 2011).
Bulbophyllum sciaphile Bosser 1965
Bulbophyllum scintilla Ridl. 1908
Bulbophyllum scopa J.J.Verm. 1990
Bulbophyllum scopula Schltr. 1913
Bulbophyllum scorpio J.J.Verm. (2008)
Bulbophyllum scrobiculilabre J.J.Sm. 1914
Bulbophyllum scutiferum J.J.Verm. 1993
Bulbophyllum scyphochilus Schltr. 1912
Bulbophyllum seabrense Campacci (2008)
Bulbophyllum secundum Hook.f. 1890
Bulbophyllum seidenfadenii A.D.Kerr (1973)
Bulbophyllum semiasperum J.J.Sm. 1934
Bulbophyllum semiindutum J.J.Verm. & P.O'Byrne (2008)
Bulbophyllum semiteres Schltr. 1913
Bulbophyllum semiteretifolium Gagnep. 1930
Bulbophyllum semperflorens J.J.Sm. 1907
Bulbophyllum sempiternum Ames 1920
Bulbophyllum senghasii G.A.Fisch. & Sieder (2009)
Bulbophyllum sensile Ames 1915
Bulbophyllum sepikense W.Kittr. (1984 publ. 1985)
Bulbophyllum septatum Schltr. 1924
Bulbophyllum septemtrionale (J.J.Sm.) J.J.Sm. 1913
Bulbophyllum serra Schltr. 1913: Toothed Bulbophyllum
Bulbophyllum serratotruncatum Seidenf. (1973 publ. 1974)
Bulbophyllum serripetalum Schltr. 1923
Bulbophyllum serrulatifolium J.J.Sm. 1929
Bulbophyllum serrulatum Schltr. in K.M.Schumann & C.A.G.Lauterbach 1905
Bulbophyllum setaceum T.P.Lin 1975: Bristly Bulbophyllum
Bulbophyllum setigerum Lindl. 1838
Bulbophyllum setilabium Aver. (2017)
Bulbophyllum setuliferum J.J.Verm. & Saw 2000
Bulbophyllum shanicum King & Pantl. 1897
Bulbophyllum shepherdii (F.Muell.) Rchb.f. 1871 – wheat-leaf rope orchid
Bulbophyllum shweliense W.W.Sm. 1921
Bulbophyllum sibuyanense Ames 1912
Bulbophyllum sicyobulbon C.S.P.Parish & Rchb.f. 1874
Bulbophyllum siederi Garay 1999: Sieder's Bulbophyllum
Bulbophyllum sigaldiae Guillaumin 1955
Bulbophyllum sigmoideum Ames & C.Schweinf. in O.Ames 1920
Bulbophyllum signatum J.J.Verm. 1996
Bulbophyllum sikapingense J.J.Sm. 1920
Bulbophyllum silentvalliensis M.P.Sharma & S.K.Srivast. 1993
Bulbophyllum sillemianum Rchb.f. 1884
Bulbophyllum simii J.J.Verm. & A.L.Lamb (2008)
Bulbophyllum simile Schltr.1913
Bulbophyllum similissimum J.J.Verm. 1991
Bulbophyllum simmondsii Kores 1989
Bulbophyllum simondii Gagnep. 1950
Bulbophyllum simplex J.J.Verm. & P.O'Byrne 2003
Bulbophyllum simplicilabellum Seidenf. 1979
Bulbophyllum simulacrum Ames 1915
Bulbophyllum sinapis J.J.Verm. & P.O'Byrne 2003
Bulbophyllum singaporeanum Schltr. 1911
Bulbophyllum singulare Schltr. 1913
Bulbophyllum sinhoense Aver. (2007)
Bulbophyllum skeatianum Ridl. 1915
Bulbophyllum smileiphyllum J.J.Verm., Schuit. & de Vogel (2014)
Bulbophyllum smithianum Schltr. 1911
Bulbophyllum smitinandii Seidenf. & Thorut 1996
Bulbophyllum socordine J.J.Verm. & Cootes (2008)
Bulbophyllum soidaoense (Seidenf.) J.J.Verm., Schuit. & de Vogel (2014)
Bulbophyllum solteroi R.González 1992
Bulbophyllum somae Hayata (1920)
Bulbophyllum sopoetanense Schltr. 1911: Mt. Sopoetan Bulbophyllum
Bulbophyllum sordidum Lindl. 1840
Bulbophyllum sororculum J.J.Verm. 2002
Bulbophyllum spadiciflorum Tixier 1966
Bulbophyllum spaniostagon J.J.Verm., Schuit. & de Vogel (2014)
Bulbophyllum spathilingue J.J.Sm. 1908
Bulbophyllum spathipetalum J.J.Sm. 1908
Bulbophyllum spathulatum (Rolfe ex E.Cooper) Seidenf. 1970
Bulbophyllum speciosum Schltr. 1912
Bulbophyllum sphaenopus J.J.Verm. (2008)
Bulbophyllum sphaeracron Schltr. 1913
Bulbophyllum sphaericum Z.H.Tsi & H.Li 1981
Bulbophyllum sphaerobulbum H.Perrier 1937
Bulbophyllum spissum J.J.Verm. 1996
Bulbophyllum spodotriche J.J.Verm. & P.O'Byrne (2008)
Bulbophyllum spongiola J.J.Verm. 1996
Bulbophyllum stabile J.J.Sm. 1911
Bulbophyllum staetophyton J.J.Verm. (2008)
Bulbophyllum stalagmotelos J.J.Verm. (2008)
Bulbophyllum stelis J.J.Sm. 1927
Bulbophyllum stellatum Ames 1912
Bulbophyllum stellula Ridl. 1916
Bulbophyllum stellulamontis J.J.Verm. & A.L.Lamb (2013)
Bulbophyllum stemonochilum J.J.Verm. (2008)
Bulbophyllum stenobulbon C.S.P.Parish & Rchb.f. 1874: Slender-bulbed Bulbophyllum
Bulbophyllum stenochilum Schltr. 1913
Bulbophyllum stenomeris J.J.Verm. & P.O'Byrne (2008). 
Bulbophyllum stenophyllum C.S.P.Parish & Rchb.f. 1874
Bulbophyllum stenophyton (Garay & W.Kittr.) 
Bulbophyllum stenorhopalon Schltr. 1921
Bulbophyllum stenuroides J.J.Verm. & P.O'Byrne (2011)
Bulbophyllum stenurum J.J.Verm. & P.O'Byrne 2003
Bulbophyllum sterile (Lam.) Suresh in D.H.Nicolson, C.R.Suresh & K.S.Manilal 1988
Bulbophyllum steyermarkii Foldats 1968
Bulbophyllum stictanthum Schltr. 1913
Bulbophyllum stictosepalum Schltr. 1913
Bulbophyllum stipitatibulbum J.J.Sm. 1931
Bulbophyllum stipulaceum Schltr. in K.M.Schumann & C.A.G.Lauterbach 1905
Bulbophyllum stockeri J.J.Verm. (2008)
Bulbophyllum stocksii (Benth. ex Hook.f.) J.J.Verm., Schuit. & de Vogel (2014)
Bulbophyllum stolleanum Schltr. 1923
Bulbophyllum stolzii Schltr. 1915
Bulbophyllum stormii J.J.Sm. 1907
Bulbophyllum streptomorphum J.J.Verm., P.O'Byrne & A.L.Lamb (2015)
Bulbophyllum streptotriche J.J.Verm. 1991
Bulbophyllum striatellum Ridl. 1890
Bulbophyllum striatulum Aver. (2016)
Bulbophyllum striatum (Griff.) Rchb.f. in W.G.Walpers 1861
Bulbophyllum strigosum (Garay) Sieder & Kiehn (2009)
Bulbophyllum stylocoryphe J.J.Verm. & P.O'Byrne (2008)
Bulbophyllum suavissimum Rolfe 1889
Bulbophyllum subaequale Ames 1923
Bulbophyllum subapetalum J.J.Sm. 1915
Bulbophyllum subapproximatum H.Perrier 1937
Bulbophyllum subbullatum J.J.Verm. 1996
Bulbophyllum subclausum J.J.Sm. 1909
Bulbophyllum subclavatum Schltr. 1925
Bulbophyllum subcrenulatum Schltr. 1925
Bulbophyllum subligaculiferum J.J.Verm. 1987
Bulbophyllum submarmoratum J.J.Sm. 1918
Bulbophyllum subpatulum J.J.Verm. 2002
Bulbophyllum subsecundum Schltr. 1916
Bulbophyllum subsessile Schltr. 1924
Bulbophyllum subtrilobatum Schltr. 1913
Bulbophyllum subumbellatum Ridl. 1896
Bulbophyllum succedaneum J.J.Sm. 1927
Bulbophyllum sukhakulii Seidenf. 1995
Bulbophyllum sulcatum (Blume) Lindl. 1830
Bulbophyllum sulfureum Schltr. 1924
Bulbophyllum sunipia J.J.Verm., Schuit. & de Vogel (2014)
Bulbophyllum superfluum Kraenzl. 1929
Bulbophyllum surigaense Ames & Quisumb. (1933 publ. 1934)
Bulbophyllum sutepense (Rolfe ex Downie) Seidenf. & Smitinand 1961

T
Bulbophyllum taeniophyllum C.S.P.Parish & Rchb.f. 1874
Bulbophyllum taeter J.J.Verm. 1996
Bulbophyllum tahanense Carr 1930
Bulbophyllum tahitense Nadeaud 1873
Bulbophyllum tahitense subsp. butaudianum Marg. (2012)
Bulbophyllum tahitense subsp. tahitense
Bulbophyllum taiwanense (Fukuy.) K.Nakaj. 1973
Bulbophyllum takeuchii (Howcroft) J.J.Verm., Schuit. & de Vogel (2014)
Bulbophyllum talauense (J.J.Sm.) Carr 1932
Bulbophyllum tampoketsense H.Perrier 1937
Bulbophyllum tanystiche J.J.Verm. 1993
Bulbophyllum tapeinophyton J.J.Verm., Schuit. & de Vogel (2014)
Bulbophyllum tarantula Schuit. & de Vogel (2005)
Bulbophyllum tardeflorens Ridl. 1896
Bulbophyllum tectipes J.J.Verm. & P.O'Byrne 2003
Bulbophyllum tectipetalum J.J.Sm. 1929
Bulbophyllum teimosense E.C.Smidt & Borba (2009)
Bulbophyllum teinophyllum J.J.Verm., Schuit. & de Vogel (2014)
Bulbophyllum tekuense Carr 1930
Bulbophyllum tengchongense Z.H.Tsi 1989
Bulbophyllum tentaculatum Schltr. 1913
Bulbophyllum tentaculiferum Schltr. 1913
Bulbophyllum tenue Schltr. 1913
Bulbophyllum tenuifolium (Blume) Lindl. 1830
Bulbophyllum tenuipes Schltr. 1913
Bulbophyllum tenuislinguae T.P.Lin & Shu H.Wu (2012)
Bulbophyllum teretibulbum H.Perrier 1937
Bulbophyllum teretifolium Schltr. 1905
Bulbophyllum teretilabre J.J.Sm. 1913
Bulbophyllum terrestre (J.J.Sm.) J.J.Verm., Schuit. & de Vogel (2014)
Bulbophyllum tetragonum Lindl. 1830
Bulbophyllum thaiorum J.J.Sm. 1912
Bulbophyllum thecanthum J.J.Verm. (2008)
Bulbophyllum theiochromum J.J.Verm., Schuit. & de Vogel (2014)
Bulbophyllum theioglossum Schltr. 1913
Bulbophyllum thelantyx J.J.Verm. 1993
Bulbophyllum therezienii Bosser 1971
Bulbophyllum thersites J.J.Verm. 1993
Bulbophyllum theunissenii J.J.Sm. 1920
Bulbophyllum thiurum J.J.Verm. & P.O'Byrne (2005)
Bulbophyllum thompsonii Ridl. 1885
Bulbophyllum thrixspermiflorum J.J.Sm. 1908
Bulbophyllum thrixspermoides J.J.Sm. 1912
Bulbophyllum thwaitesii Rchb.f. 1874
Bulbophyllum thymophorum J.J.Verm. & A.L.Lamb 1988
Bulbophyllum tianguii K.Y.Lang & D.Luo (2007)
Bulbophyllum tigridum Hance (1883)
Bulbophyllum tindemansianum J.J.Verm., de Vogel & A.Vogel (2010)
Bulbophyllum tinekeae Schuit. & de Vogel (2005)
Bulbophyllum tipula Aver. (2016)
Bulbophyllum titanea Ridl. 1908
Bulbophyllum tixieri Seidenf. 1992
Bulbophyllum toilliezae Bosser 1965
Bulbophyllum tokioi Fukuy. 1935
Bulbophyllum toppingii Ames (1913 publ. 1914)
Bulbophyllum torajarum J.J.Verm. & P.O'Byrne (2008)
Bulbophyllum toranum J.J.Sm. 1912
Bulbophyllum torquatum J.J.Sm. 1929
Bulbophyllum torricellense Schltr. 1913
Bulbophyllum tortum Schltr. 1913
Bulbophyllum tortuosum (Blume) Lindl. 1830
Bulbophyllum tothastes J.J.Verm. (1991)
Bulbophyllum trachyanthum Kraenzl. 1894
Bulbophyllum trachybracteum Schltr. 1913
Bulbophyllum trachyglossum Schltr. in K.M.Schumann & C.A.G.Lauterbach 1905
Bulbophyllum trachypus Schltr. 1913
Bulbophyllum translucidum Kindler, R.Bustam. & Ferreras (2016)
Bulbophyllum tremulum Wight 1851
Bulbophyllum treschii Jenny (2012)
Bulbophyllum triadenium (Lindl.) Rchb.f. in W.G.Walpers 1861
Bulbophyllum triaristella Schltr. 1913
Bulbophyllum tricanaliferum J.J.Sm. 1913
Bulbophyllum tricarinatum Petch 1923
Bulbophyllum tricaudatum J.J.Verm. (2008)
Bulbophyllum trichaete Schltr. 1913
Bulbophyllum trichochlamys H.Perrier 1937
Bulbophyllum trichorhachis J.J.Verm. & P.O'Byrne 2003
Bulbophyllum trichromum Schltr. 1923
Bulbophyllum triclavigerum J.J.Sm. 1913
Bulbophyllum tricolor L.B.Sm. & S.K.Harris 1936
Bulbophyllum tricorne Seidenf. & Smitinand 1965
Bulbophyllum tricornoides Seidenf. 1979
Bulbophyllum tridentatum Kraenzl. 1901: Three-toothed Bulbophyllum
Bulbophyllum trifarium Rolfe 1910
Bulbophyllum trifilum J.J.Sm. 1908
Bulbophyllum trifilum subsp. filisepalum (J.J.Sm.) J.J.Verm. (2002 publ. 2003)
Bulbophyllum trifilum subsp. trifilum
Bulbophyllum triflorum (Breda) Blume 1828
Bulbophyllum trifolium Ridl. 1897
Bulbophyllum trigonidioides J.J.Sm. 1935
Bulbophyllum trigonobulbum Schltr. & J.J.Sm. 1914
Bulbophyllum trigonocarpum Schltr. in K.M.Schumann & C.A.G.Lauterbach 1905
Bulbophyllum trigonopus (Rchb.f.) P.T.Ong (2017)
Bulbophyllum trigonosepalum Kraenzl. (1921)
Bulbophyllum trilineatum H.Perrier 1937
Bulbophyllum trimenii (Hook.f.) J.J.Sm. 1912
Bulbophyllum trinervium J.J.Sm. 1935
Bulbophyllum trineuron J.J.Verm. & A.L.Lamb (2013)
Bulbophyllum tripetalum Lindl. 1842
Bulbophyllum tripudians C.S.P.Parish & Rchb.f. 1875
Bulbophyllum trirhopalon Schltr. 1913
Bulbophyllum triste Rchb.f. in W.G.Walpers 1861
Bulbophyllum tristelidium W.Kittr. (1984 publ. 1985)
Bulbophyllum tristriatum Carr (1930)
Bulbophyllum triviale Seidenf. 1979
Bulbophyllum tropidopous J.J.Verm., P.O'Byrne & A.L.Lamb (2015)
Bulbophyllum trulliferum J.J.Verm. & A.L.Lamb 1994
Bulbophyllum truncatum J.J.Sm. 1913
Bulbophyllum tryssum J.J.Verm. & A.L.Lamb 1994
Bulbophyllum tseanum (S.Y.Hu & Barretto) Z.H.Tsi 1999
Bulbophyllum tsekourioides M.Leon, Naive & Cootes (2017)
Bulbophyllum tsii J.J.Verm., Schuit. & de Vogel (2014)
Bulbophyllum tuberculatum Colenso 1884
Bulbophyllum tubilabrum J.J.Verm. & P.O'Byrne 2003
Bulbophyllum tumidum J.J.Verm. 1991
Bulbophyllum tumoriferum Schltr. 1913
Bulbophyllum turgidum J.J.Verm. 1991
Bulbophyllum turkii Bosser & P.J.Cribb 2001
Bulbophyllum turpe J.J.Verm. & P.O'Byrne 2003
Bulbophyllum tylophorum Schltr. 1911

U
Bulbophyllum uhl-gabrielianum Chiron & V.P.Castro (2009)
Bulbophyllum umbellatum Lindl. 1830: Umbrella Bulbophyllum
Bulbophyllum umbellatum var. fuscescens (Hook.f.) P.K.Sarkar 1984
Bulbophyllum umbellatum var. umbellatum
Bulbophyllum uncinatum J.J.Verm. & P.O'Byrne 2003
Bulbophyllum unciniferum Seidenf. 1973
Bulbophyllum undatilabre J.J.Sm. 1912
Bulbophyllum undecifilum J.J.Sm. 1927
Bulbophyllum unguiculatum Rchb.f. 1850
Bulbophyllum unguilabium Schltr. 1913
Bulbophyllum unicaudatum Schltr. 1913
Bulbophyllum unicaudatum var. unicaudatum
Bulbophyllum unicaudatum var. xanthosphaerum Schltr. 1913
Bulbophyllum uniflorum (Blume) Hassk. 1844
Bulbophyllum unifoliatum De Wild. 1921
Bulbophyllum unifoliatum subsp. flectens (P.J.Cribb & P.Taylor) J.J.Verm. 1987
Bulbophyllum unifoliatum subsp. infracarinatum (G.Will.) J.J.Verm. 1987
Bulbophyllum unifoliatum subsp. unifoliatum
Bulbophyllum unitubum J.J.Sm. 1929
Bulbophyllum univenum J.J.Verm. 1993
Bulbophyllum upupops J.J.Verm., P.O'Byrne & A.L.Lamb (2015)
Bulbophyllum urceolatum A.D.Hawkes 1952
Bulbophyllum uroglossum Schltr. 1921
Bulbophyllum uroplatoides Hermans & G.A.Fisch. (2009)
Bulbophyllum urosepalum Schltr. 1913
Bulbophyllum ustusfortiter J.J.Verm. 1993
Bulbophyllum uviflorum P.O'Byrne 1999

V
Bulbophyllum vaccinioides Schltr. 1913
Bulbophyllum vagans Ames & Rolfe 1907
Bulbophyllum vaginatum (Lindl.) Rchb.f. in W.G.Walpers 1861
Bulbophyllum vakonae Hermans (2007)
Bulbophyllum valeryi J.J.Verm. & P.O'Byrne 2003
Bulbophyllum validum Carr 1933
Bulbophyllum vanroyenii J.J.Verm., Schuit. & de Vogel, (2014)
Bulbophyllum vanum J.J.Verm. 1984
Bulbophyllum vanvuurenii J.J.Sm. 1917
Bulbophyllum vareschii Foldats 1968
Bulbophyllum variculosum J.J.Verm. (2008)
Bulbophyllum variegatum Thouars 1822
Bulbophyllum veitchianum Garay ex W.E.Higgins (2009)
Bulbophyllum veldkampii J.J.Verm. & P.O'Byrne (2011)
Bulbophyllum ventriosum H.Perrier 1937
Bulbophyllum venulosum J.J.Verm. & A.L.Lamb (2008)
Bulbophyllum vermiculare Hook.f. 1890
Bulbophyllum verruciferum Schltr. 1913
Bulbophyllum verruciferum var. carinatisepalum Schltr. 1913
Bulbophyllum verruciferum var. verruciferum
Bulbophyllum verrucosum (L.O.Williams) J.J.Verm., Schuit. & de Vogel (2014)
Bulbophyllum verruculatum Schltr. 1913
Bulbophyllum verruculiferum H.Perrier 1951
Bulbophyllum versteegii J.J.Sm. 1908
Bulbophyllum vesiculosum J.J.Sm. 1917
Bulbophyllum vespertilio Ferreras & Cootes (2010)
Bulbophyllum vestigipetalum J.J.Verm. & A.L.Lamb (2013)
Bulbophyllum vestitum Bosser 1971
Bulbophyllum vestitum var. meridionale Bosser 1971
Bulbophyllum vestitum var. vestitum
Bulbophyllum vexillarium Ridl. 1916
Bulbophyllum vietnamense Seidenf. 1975
Bulbophyllum viguieri Schltr. 1922
Bulbophyllum violaceolabellum Seidenf. 1981
Bulbophyllum violaceum (Blume) Lindl. 1830
Bulbophyllum virens (Lindl.) Hook.f. (1890)
Bulbophyllum viridescens Ridl. (1908)
Bulbophyllum viridiflorum (Hook.f.) Schltr. 1910
Bulbophyllum vitellinum Ridl. 1897
Bulbophyllum vittatum Teijsm. & Binn. 1862
Bulbophyllum vulcanicum Kraenzl. 1914
Bulbophyllum vulcanorum H.Perrier 1938
Bulbophyllum vutimenaense B.A.Lewis 1992

W
Bulbophyllum wadsworthii Dockrill 1964 – yellow rope orchid
Bulbophyllum wagneri Schltr. 1921
Bulbophyllum wakoi Howcroft 1999
Bulbophyllum wallichii Rchb.f. in W.G.Walpers 1861
Bulbophyllum wangkaense Seidenf. 1979
Bulbophyllum warianum Schltr. 1913
Bulbophyllum weberbauerianum Kraenzl. 1905
Bulbophyllum weberi Ames 1912
Bulbophyllum wechsbergii Sieder & Kiehn (2009)
Bulbophyllum weddelii (Lindl.) Rchb.f. in W.G.Walpers 1861: Weddel's Bulbophyllum
Bulbophyllum weinthalii R.S.Rogers 1933: Weinthal's Bulbophyllum
Bulbophyllum weinthalii subsp. striatum D.L.Jones 2001
Bulbophyllum weinthalii subsp. weinthalii
Bulbophyllum wendlandianum (Kraenzl.) J.J.Sm. 1912
Bulbophyllum werneri Schltr. 1913
Bulbophyllum wightii Rchb.f. in W.G.Walpers 1861
Bulbophyllum wilkianum T.E.Hunt 1947
Bulbophyllum williamsii A.D.Hawkes 1956
Bulbophyllum windsorense B.Gray & D.L.Jones 1989 – thread-tipped rope orchid
Bulbophyllum woelfliae Garay, Senghas & K.Lemcke 1996
Bulbophyllum wolfei B.Gray & D.L.Jones 1991 – fleshy snake orchid
Bulbophyllum wollastonii Ridl. 1916
Bulbophyllum wrayi Hook.f. 1890
Bulbophyllum wuzhishanense X.H.Jin (2005)

X
Bulbophyllum xantanthum Schltr. 1911
Bulbophyllum xanthoacron J.J.Sm. 1911
Bulbophyllum xanthobulbum Schltr. 1918
Bulbophyllum xanthochlamys Schltr. 1913
Bulbophyllum xanthochloron J.J.Verm. (2014)
Bulbophyllum xanthomelanon J.J.Verm. & P.O'Byrne (2008)
Bulbophyllum xanthophaeum Schltr. 1913
Bulbophyllum xanthornis Schuit. & de Vogel 2002
Bulbophyllum xanthotes Schltr. 1913
Bulbophyllum xanthum Ridl. 1920
Bulbophyllum xenosum J.J.Verm. 1996
Bulbophyllum xiajinchuangense Z.J.Liu, L.J.Chen & W.H.Rao (2010)
Bulbophyllum xiphion J.J.Verm. 1996
Bulbophyllum xylinopus J.J.Verm., P.O'Byrne & A.L.Lamb (2015)
Bulbophyllum xylophyllum C.S.P.Parish & Rchb.f. 1874
Bulbophyllum xyphoglossum J.J.Verm., de Vogel & A.Vogel (2010)

Y
Bulbophyllum yingjiangense B.M.Wang & J.W.Zhai (2017)
Bulbophyllum yoksunense J.J.Sm. 1912
Bulbophyllum yunnanense Rolfe 1901

Z
Bulbophyllum zambalense Ames 1912
Bulbophyllum zamboangense Ames (1913 publ. 1914)
Bulbophyllum zaratananae Schltr. 1924
Bulbophyllum zaratananae subsp. disjunctum H.Perrier ex Herman (2007)
Bulbophyllum zaratananae subsp. zaratananae
Bulbophyllum zebrinum J.J.Sm. 1911
Bulbophyllum zophyranthum J.J.Verm., Schuit. & de Vogel (2014)
Bulbophyllum zygochilum J.J.Verm. (2008)

References 

The Bulbophyllum-Checklist
The World Checklist of Monocotyledons
The Internet Orchid Species Photo Encyclopedia

External links 

 Species
Lists of plant species